

61001–61100 

|-bgcolor=#fefefe
| 61001 ||  || — || May 28, 2000 || Socorro || LINEAR || NYS || align=right | 1.5 km || 
|-id=002 bgcolor=#fefefe
| 61002 ||  || — || May 28, 2000 || Socorro || LINEAR || — || align=right | 2.3 km || 
|-id=003 bgcolor=#fefefe
| 61003 ||  || — || May 28, 2000 || Socorro || LINEAR || — || align=right | 1.7 km || 
|-id=004 bgcolor=#fefefe
| 61004 ||  || — || May 28, 2000 || Socorro || LINEAR || — || align=right | 2.0 km || 
|-id=005 bgcolor=#fefefe
| 61005 ||  || — || May 27, 2000 || Socorro || LINEAR || — || align=right | 2.2 km || 
|-id=006 bgcolor=#fefefe
| 61006 ||  || — || May 27, 2000 || Socorro || LINEAR || FLO || align=right | 1.4 km || 
|-id=007 bgcolor=#fefefe
| 61007 ||  || — || May 27, 2000 || Socorro || LINEAR || V || align=right | 1.2 km || 
|-id=008 bgcolor=#fefefe
| 61008 ||  || — || May 27, 2000 || Socorro || LINEAR || V || align=right | 1.8 km || 
|-id=009 bgcolor=#fefefe
| 61009 ||  || — || May 27, 2000 || Socorro || LINEAR || — || align=right | 1.8 km || 
|-id=010 bgcolor=#E9E9E9
| 61010 ||  || — || May 28, 2000 || Socorro || LINEAR || — || align=right | 3.3 km || 
|-id=011 bgcolor=#fefefe
| 61011 ||  || — || May 26, 2000 || Kitt Peak || Spacewatch || NYS || align=right | 1.9 km || 
|-id=012 bgcolor=#fefefe
| 61012 ||  || — || May 27, 2000 || Socorro || LINEAR || — || align=right | 2.4 km || 
|-id=013 bgcolor=#E9E9E9
| 61013 ||  || — || May 27, 2000 || Socorro || LINEAR || — || align=right | 4.4 km || 
|-id=014 bgcolor=#fefefe
| 61014 ||  || — || May 27, 2000 || Socorro || LINEAR || NYS || align=right | 1.6 km || 
|-id=015 bgcolor=#E9E9E9
| 61015 ||  || — || May 28, 2000 || Socorro || LINEAR || — || align=right | 2.9 km || 
|-id=016 bgcolor=#fefefe
| 61016 ||  || — || May 25, 2000 || Kitt Peak || Spacewatch || FLO || align=right | 1.0 km || 
|-id=017 bgcolor=#E9E9E9
| 61017 ||  || — || May 25, 2000 || Kitt Peak || Spacewatch || — || align=right | 2.2 km || 
|-id=018 bgcolor=#fefefe
| 61018 ||  || — || May 30, 2000 || Kitt Peak || Spacewatch || — || align=right | 2.1 km || 
|-id=019 bgcolor=#fefefe
| 61019 ||  || — || May 27, 2000 || Socorro || LINEAR || — || align=right | 2.7 km || 
|-id=020 bgcolor=#d6d6d6
| 61020 ||  || — || May 27, 2000 || Socorro || LINEAR || — || align=right | 6.3 km || 
|-id=021 bgcolor=#fefefe
| 61021 ||  || — || May 30, 2000 || Kitt Peak || Spacewatch || — || align=right | 2.0 km || 
|-id=022 bgcolor=#fefefe
| 61022 ||  || — || May 30, 2000 || Kitt Peak || Spacewatch || V || align=right | 1.7 km || 
|-id=023 bgcolor=#fefefe
| 61023 ||  || — || May 28, 2000 || Socorro || LINEAR || — || align=right | 2.4 km || 
|-id=024 bgcolor=#d6d6d6
| 61024 ||  || — || May 23, 2000 || Anderson Mesa || LONEOS || EOS || align=right | 6.2 km || 
|-id=025 bgcolor=#E9E9E9
| 61025 ||  || — || May 25, 2000 || Anderson Mesa || LONEOS || — || align=right | 5.0 km || 
|-id=026 bgcolor=#fefefe
| 61026 ||  || — || May 28, 2000 || Socorro || LINEAR || — || align=right | 2.2 km || 
|-id=027 bgcolor=#E9E9E9
| 61027 ||  || — || May 29, 2000 || Socorro || LINEAR || — || align=right | 2.3 km || 
|-id=028 bgcolor=#fefefe
| 61028 ||  || — || May 29, 2000 || Socorro || LINEAR || — || align=right | 3.3 km || 
|-id=029 bgcolor=#fefefe
| 61029 ||  || — || May 27, 2000 || Socorro || LINEAR || — || align=right | 2.5 km || 
|-id=030 bgcolor=#fefefe
| 61030 ||  || — || May 27, 2000 || Socorro || LINEAR || — || align=right | 1.7 km || 
|-id=031 bgcolor=#fefefe
| 61031 ||  || — || May 27, 2000 || Socorro || LINEAR || — || align=right | 1.7 km || 
|-id=032 bgcolor=#fefefe
| 61032 ||  || — || May 27, 2000 || Socorro || LINEAR || FLO || align=right | 1.7 km || 
|-id=033 bgcolor=#fefefe
| 61033 ||  || — || May 27, 2000 || Socorro || LINEAR || — || align=right | 1.6 km || 
|-id=034 bgcolor=#d6d6d6
| 61034 ||  || — || May 27, 2000 || Socorro || LINEAR || — || align=right | 6.4 km || 
|-id=035 bgcolor=#d6d6d6
| 61035 ||  || — || May 24, 2000 || Kitt Peak || Spacewatch || — || align=right | 4.9 km || 
|-id=036 bgcolor=#fefefe
| 61036 ||  || — || May 24, 2000 || Kitt Peak || Spacewatch || V || align=right | 1.5 km || 
|-id=037 bgcolor=#E9E9E9
| 61037 ||  || — || May 24, 2000 || Kitt Peak || Spacewatch || — || align=right | 3.5 km || 
|-id=038 bgcolor=#E9E9E9
| 61038 ||  || — || May 25, 2000 || Anderson Mesa || LONEOS || — || align=right | 3.6 km || 
|-id=039 bgcolor=#d6d6d6
| 61039 ||  || — || May 25, 2000 || Anderson Mesa || LONEOS || THM || align=right | 7.7 km || 
|-id=040 bgcolor=#d6d6d6
| 61040 ||  || — || May 25, 2000 || Anderson Mesa || LONEOS || — || align=right | 6.6 km || 
|-id=041 bgcolor=#E9E9E9
| 61041 ||  || — || May 25, 2000 || Anderson Mesa || LONEOS || — || align=right | 2.4 km || 
|-id=042 bgcolor=#d6d6d6
| 61042 Noviello ||  ||  || May 25, 2000 || Anderson Mesa || LONEOS || HIL3:2 || align=right | 16 km || 
|-id=043 bgcolor=#fefefe
| 61043 ||  || — || May 25, 2000 || Anderson Mesa || LONEOS || — || align=right | 3.9 km || 
|-id=044 bgcolor=#d6d6d6
| 61044 ||  || — || May 26, 2000 || Anderson Mesa || LONEOS || — || align=right | 3.8 km || 
|-id=045 bgcolor=#fefefe
| 61045 ||  || — || May 26, 2000 || Anderson Mesa || LONEOS || — || align=right | 2.0 km || 
|-id=046 bgcolor=#E9E9E9
| 61046 ||  || — || May 26, 2000 || Anderson Mesa || LONEOS || — || align=right | 3.5 km || 
|-id=047 bgcolor=#fefefe
| 61047 ||  || — || May 26, 2000 || Anderson Mesa || LONEOS || — || align=right | 1.5 km || 
|-id=048 bgcolor=#E9E9E9
| 61048 ||  || — || May 26, 2000 || Anderson Mesa || LONEOS || — || align=right | 8.3 km || 
|-id=049 bgcolor=#E9E9E9
| 61049 ||  || — || May 27, 2000 || Socorro || LINEAR || — || align=right | 3.0 km || 
|-id=050 bgcolor=#fefefe
| 61050 ||  || — || May 28, 2000 || Socorro || LINEAR || — || align=right | 2.2 km || 
|-id=051 bgcolor=#fefefe
| 61051 ||  || — || May 28, 2000 || Anderson Mesa || LONEOS || — || align=right | 2.1 km || 
|-id=052 bgcolor=#fefefe
| 61052 ||  || — || May 28, 2000 || Anderson Mesa || LONEOS || EUT || align=right | 2.2 km || 
|-id=053 bgcolor=#d6d6d6
| 61053 ||  || — || May 27, 2000 || Socorro || LINEAR || — || align=right | 8.7 km || 
|-id=054 bgcolor=#E9E9E9
| 61054 ||  || — || May 27, 2000 || Socorro || LINEAR || — || align=right | 4.1 km || 
|-id=055 bgcolor=#E9E9E9
| 61055 ||  || — || May 27, 2000 || Socorro || LINEAR || — || align=right | 5.0 km || 
|-id=056 bgcolor=#E9E9E9
| 61056 ||  || — || May 27, 2000 || Socorro || LINEAR || — || align=right | 2.7 km || 
|-id=057 bgcolor=#E9E9E9
| 61057 ||  || — || May 27, 2000 || Anderson Mesa || LONEOS || — || align=right | 3.8 km || 
|-id=058 bgcolor=#fefefe
| 61058 ||  || — || May 27, 2000 || Socorro || LINEAR || — || align=right | 1.9 km || 
|-id=059 bgcolor=#fefefe
| 61059 || 2000 LX || — || June 2, 2000 || Kitt Peak || Spacewatch || — || align=right | 2.6 km || 
|-id=060 bgcolor=#fefefe
| 61060 ||  || — || June 2, 2000 || Črni Vrh || Črni Vrh || — || align=right | 1.9 km || 
|-id=061 bgcolor=#fefefe
| 61061 ||  || — || June 4, 2000 || Socorro || LINEAR || PHO || align=right | 2.7 km || 
|-id=062 bgcolor=#fefefe
| 61062 ||  || — || June 3, 2000 || Prescott || P. G. Comba || — || align=right | 2.3 km || 
|-id=063 bgcolor=#E9E9E9
| 61063 ||  || — || June 4, 2000 || Socorro || LINEAR || — || align=right | 6.9 km || 
|-id=064 bgcolor=#fefefe
| 61064 ||  || — || June 5, 2000 || Socorro || LINEAR || FLO || align=right | 3.8 km || 
|-id=065 bgcolor=#fefefe
| 61065 ||  || — || June 5, 2000 || Socorro || LINEAR || FLO || align=right | 1.5 km || 
|-id=066 bgcolor=#fefefe
| 61066 ||  || — || June 4, 2000 || Reedy Creek || J. Broughton || NYS || align=right | 1.5 km || 
|-id=067 bgcolor=#fefefe
| 61067 ||  || — || June 6, 2000 || Prescott || P. G. Comba || FLO || align=right | 2.2 km || 
|-id=068 bgcolor=#fefefe
| 61068 ||  || — || June 6, 2000 || Prescott || P. G. Comba || V || align=right | 1.5 km || 
|-id=069 bgcolor=#fefefe
| 61069 ||  || — || June 5, 2000 || Socorro || LINEAR || V || align=right | 2.1 km || 
|-id=070 bgcolor=#E9E9E9
| 61070 ||  || — || June 5, 2000 || Socorro || LINEAR || — || align=right | 6.1 km || 
|-id=071 bgcolor=#fefefe
| 61071 ||  || — || June 5, 2000 || Socorro || LINEAR || — || align=right | 1.8 km || 
|-id=072 bgcolor=#fefefe
| 61072 ||  || — || June 5, 2000 || Socorro || LINEAR || FLO || align=right | 2.6 km || 
|-id=073 bgcolor=#E9E9E9
| 61073 ||  || — || June 5, 2000 || Socorro || LINEAR || — || align=right | 2.7 km || 
|-id=074 bgcolor=#E9E9E9
| 61074 ||  || — || June 5, 2000 || Socorro || LINEAR || — || align=right | 3.9 km || 
|-id=075 bgcolor=#E9E9E9
| 61075 ||  || — || June 1, 2000 || Socorro || LINEAR || — || align=right | 4.1 km || 
|-id=076 bgcolor=#E9E9E9
| 61076 ||  || — || June 7, 2000 || Socorro || LINEAR || EUN || align=right | 4.1 km || 
|-id=077 bgcolor=#fefefe
| 61077 ||  || — || June 7, 2000 || Kitt Peak || Spacewatch || — || align=right | 1.7 km || 
|-id=078 bgcolor=#fefefe
| 61078 ||  || — || June 6, 2000 || Anderson Mesa || LONEOS || — || align=right | 2.3 km || 
|-id=079 bgcolor=#fefefe
| 61079 ||  || — || June 8, 2000 || Socorro || LINEAR || FLO || align=right | 3.2 km || 
|-id=080 bgcolor=#fefefe
| 61080 ||  || — || June 8, 2000 || Socorro || LINEAR || — || align=right | 3.6 km || 
|-id=081 bgcolor=#fefefe
| 61081 ||  || — || June 8, 2000 || Socorro || LINEAR || — || align=right | 1.8 km || 
|-id=082 bgcolor=#fefefe
| 61082 ||  || — || June 8, 2000 || Socorro || LINEAR || — || align=right | 2.8 km || 
|-id=083 bgcolor=#fefefe
| 61083 ||  || — || June 8, 2000 || Socorro || LINEAR || — || align=right | 2.6 km || 
|-id=084 bgcolor=#d6d6d6
| 61084 ||  || — || June 8, 2000 || Socorro || LINEAR || — || align=right | 5.2 km || 
|-id=085 bgcolor=#fefefe
| 61085 ||  || — || June 8, 2000 || Socorro || LINEAR || — || align=right | 2.2 km || 
|-id=086 bgcolor=#fefefe
| 61086 ||  || — || June 8, 2000 || Socorro || LINEAR || FLO || align=right | 1.3 km || 
|-id=087 bgcolor=#E9E9E9
| 61087 ||  || — || June 8, 2000 || Socorro || LINEAR || — || align=right | 7.0 km || 
|-id=088 bgcolor=#fefefe
| 61088 ||  || — || June 8, 2000 || Socorro || LINEAR || — || align=right | 5.6 km || 
|-id=089 bgcolor=#d6d6d6
| 61089 ||  || — || June 6, 2000 || Kitt Peak || Spacewatch || EOS || align=right | 4.1 km || 
|-id=090 bgcolor=#fefefe
| 61090 ||  || — || June 1, 2000 || Socorro || LINEAR || PHO || align=right | 3.5 km || 
|-id=091 bgcolor=#fefefe
| 61091 ||  || — || June 6, 2000 || Anderson Mesa || LONEOS || NYS || align=right | 2.4 km || 
|-id=092 bgcolor=#fefefe
| 61092 ||  || — || June 6, 2000 || Anderson Mesa || LONEOS || NYS || align=right | 6.3 km || 
|-id=093 bgcolor=#fefefe
| 61093 ||  || — || June 6, 2000 || Anderson Mesa || LONEOS || NYS || align=right | 1.9 km || 
|-id=094 bgcolor=#E9E9E9
| 61094 ||  || — || June 6, 2000 || Anderson Mesa || LONEOS || DOR || align=right | 8.7 km || 
|-id=095 bgcolor=#fefefe
| 61095 ||  || — || June 9, 2000 || Anderson Mesa || LONEOS || — || align=right | 1.9 km || 
|-id=096 bgcolor=#fefefe
| 61096 ||  || — || June 9, 2000 || Anderson Mesa || LONEOS || NYS || align=right | 5.7 km || 
|-id=097 bgcolor=#fefefe
| 61097 ||  || — || June 12, 2000 || Socorro || LINEAR || H || align=right | 1.7 km || 
|-id=098 bgcolor=#fefefe
| 61098 ||  || — || June 6, 2000 || Anderson Mesa || LONEOS || V || align=right | 2.5 km || 
|-id=099 bgcolor=#E9E9E9
| 61099 ||  || — || June 11, 2000 || Anderson Mesa || LONEOS || — || align=right | 2.8 km || 
|-id=100 bgcolor=#fefefe
| 61100 ||  || — || June 11, 2000 || Anderson Mesa || LONEOS || — || align=right | 2.1 km || 
|}

61101–61200 

|-bgcolor=#fefefe
| 61101 ||  || — || June 7, 2000 || Socorro || LINEAR || FLO || align=right | 1.4 km || 
|-id=102 bgcolor=#d6d6d6
| 61102 ||  || — || June 7, 2000 || Anderson Mesa || LONEOS || 7:4 || align=right | 11 km || 
|-id=103 bgcolor=#E9E9E9
| 61103 ||  || — || June 9, 2000 || Haleakala || NEAT || — || align=right | 6.4 km || 
|-id=104 bgcolor=#fefefe
| 61104 ||  || — || June 10, 2000 || Socorro || LINEAR || V || align=right | 1.9 km || 
|-id=105 bgcolor=#fefefe
| 61105 ||  || — || June 5, 2000 || Anderson Mesa || LONEOS || — || align=right | 2.1 km || 
|-id=106 bgcolor=#E9E9E9
| 61106 ||  || — || June 5, 2000 || Anderson Mesa || LONEOS || — || align=right | 4.1 km || 
|-id=107 bgcolor=#fefefe
| 61107 ||  || — || June 5, 2000 || Anderson Mesa || LONEOS || — || align=right | 1.7 km || 
|-id=108 bgcolor=#E9E9E9
| 61108 ||  || — || June 5, 2000 || Anderson Mesa || LONEOS || — || align=right | 3.0 km || 
|-id=109 bgcolor=#fefefe
| 61109 ||  || — || June 5, 2000 || Anderson Mesa || LONEOS || — || align=right | 2.2 km || 
|-id=110 bgcolor=#fefefe
| 61110 ||  || — || June 5, 2000 || Anderson Mesa || LONEOS || FLO || align=right | 1.7 km || 
|-id=111 bgcolor=#fefefe
| 61111 ||  || — || June 4, 2000 || Kitt Peak || Spacewatch || FLO || align=right | 2.3 km || 
|-id=112 bgcolor=#fefefe
| 61112 ||  || — || June 4, 2000 || Haleakala || NEAT || V || align=right | 1.3 km || 
|-id=113 bgcolor=#fefefe
| 61113 ||  || — || June 4, 2000 || Haleakala || NEAT || PHO || align=right | 2.3 km || 
|-id=114 bgcolor=#E9E9E9
| 61114 ||  || — || June 3, 2000 || Anderson Mesa || LONEOS || — || align=right | 3.2 km || 
|-id=115 bgcolor=#E9E9E9
| 61115 ||  || — || June 3, 2000 || Anderson Mesa || LONEOS || — || align=right | 7.6 km || 
|-id=116 bgcolor=#fefefe
| 61116 ||  || — || June 3, 2000 || Kitt Peak || Spacewatch || — || align=right | 1.9 km || 
|-id=117 bgcolor=#fefefe
| 61117 ||  || — || June 1, 2000 || Haleakala || NEAT || V || align=right | 1.5 km || 
|-id=118 bgcolor=#fefefe
| 61118 ||  || — || June 1, 2000 || Anderson Mesa || LONEOS || FLO || align=right | 2.7 km || 
|-id=119 bgcolor=#fefefe
| 61119 ||  || — || June 1, 2000 || Haleakala || NEAT || — || align=right | 2.1 km || 
|-id=120 bgcolor=#E9E9E9
| 61120 ||  || — || June 1, 2000 || Haleakala || NEAT || — || align=right | 3.1 km || 
|-id=121 bgcolor=#fefefe
| 61121 || 2000 MU || — || June 23, 2000 || Reedy Creek || J. Broughton || NYS || align=right | 1.7 km || 
|-id=122 bgcolor=#fefefe
| 61122 ||  || — || June 25, 2000 || Socorro || LINEAR || FLO || align=right | 1.8 km || 
|-id=123 bgcolor=#fefefe
| 61123 ||  || — || June 25, 2000 || Socorro || LINEAR || — || align=right | 3.3 km || 
|-id=124 bgcolor=#fefefe
| 61124 ||  || — || June 27, 2000 || Reedy Creek || J. Broughton || NYS || align=right | 1.8 km || 
|-id=125 bgcolor=#fefefe
| 61125 ||  || — || June 24, 2000 || Haleakala || NEAT || NYS || align=right | 1.7 km || 
|-id=126 bgcolor=#E9E9E9
| 61126 ||  || — || June 25, 2000 || Socorro || LINEAR || VIB || align=right | 7.4 km || 
|-id=127 bgcolor=#fefefe
| 61127 ||  || — || June 26, 2000 || Socorro || LINEAR || — || align=right | 2.6 km || 
|-id=128 bgcolor=#E9E9E9
| 61128 ||  || — || June 24, 2000 || Socorro || LINEAR || — || align=right | 2.9 km || 
|-id=129 bgcolor=#fefefe
| 61129 ||  || — || June 24, 2000 || Socorro || LINEAR || NYS || align=right | 2.1 km || 
|-id=130 bgcolor=#fefefe
| 61130 || 2000 NK || — || July 2, 2000 || Prescott || P. G. Comba || — || align=right | 3.5 km || 
|-id=131 bgcolor=#fefefe
| 61131 ||  || — || July 3, 2000 || Kitt Peak || Spacewatch || V || align=right | 2.1 km || 
|-id=132 bgcolor=#fefefe
| 61132 ||  || — || July 5, 2000 || Reedy Creek || J. Broughton || NYS || align=right | 4.5 km || 
|-id=133 bgcolor=#fefefe
| 61133 ||  || — || July 5, 2000 || Prescott || P. G. Comba || — || align=right | 2.1 km || 
|-id=134 bgcolor=#fefefe
| 61134 ||  || — || July 3, 2000 || Socorro || LINEAR || V || align=right | 1.7 km || 
|-id=135 bgcolor=#E9E9E9
| 61135 ||  || — || July 5, 2000 || Ondřejov || P. Kušnirák, P. Pravec || — || align=right | 2.6 km || 
|-id=136 bgcolor=#E9E9E9
| 61136 ||  || — || July 3, 2000 || Kitt Peak || Spacewatch || — || align=right | 6.6 km || 
|-id=137 bgcolor=#fefefe
| 61137 ||  || — || July 3, 2000 || Kitt Peak || Spacewatch || NYS || align=right | 4.5 km || 
|-id=138 bgcolor=#fefefe
| 61138 ||  || — || July 7, 2000 || Socorro || LINEAR || FLO || align=right | 1.6 km || 
|-id=139 bgcolor=#fefefe
| 61139 ||  || — || July 7, 2000 || Socorro || LINEAR || — || align=right | 2.3 km || 
|-id=140 bgcolor=#E9E9E9
| 61140 ||  || — || July 8, 2000 || Socorro || LINEAR || — || align=right | 3.5 km || 
|-id=141 bgcolor=#E9E9E9
| 61141 ||  || — || July 8, 2000 || Bisei SG Center || BATTeRS || EUN || align=right | 3.6 km || 
|-id=142 bgcolor=#fefefe
| 61142 ||  || — || July 4, 2000 || Kitt Peak || Spacewatch || FLO || align=right | 2.3 km || 
|-id=143 bgcolor=#d6d6d6
| 61143 ||  || — || July 4, 2000 || Kitt Peak || Spacewatch || — || align=right | 7.3 km || 
|-id=144 bgcolor=#fefefe
| 61144 ||  || — || July 5, 2000 || Goodricke-Pigott || R. A. Tucker || — || align=right | 1.6 km || 
|-id=145 bgcolor=#fefefe
| 61145 ||  || — || July 7, 2000 || Socorro || LINEAR || FLO || align=right | 2.5 km || 
|-id=146 bgcolor=#fefefe
| 61146 ||  || — || July 10, 2000 || Valinhos || P. R. Holvorcem || — || align=right | 2.7 km || 
|-id=147 bgcolor=#fefefe
| 61147 ||  || — || July 10, 2000 || Valinhos || P. R. Holvorcem || NYS || align=right | 2.6 km || 
|-id=148 bgcolor=#fefefe
| 61148 ||  || — || July 10, 2000 || Valinhos || Valinhos Obs. || MAS || align=right | 2.3 km || 
|-id=149 bgcolor=#fefefe
| 61149 ||  || — || July 4, 2000 || Anderson Mesa || LONEOS || — || align=right | 3.4 km || 
|-id=150 bgcolor=#fefefe
| 61150 ||  || — || July 4, 2000 || Anderson Mesa || LONEOS || — || align=right | 2.1 km || 
|-id=151 bgcolor=#fefefe
| 61151 ||  || — || July 5, 2000 || Anderson Mesa || LONEOS || — || align=right | 1.7 km || 
|-id=152 bgcolor=#fefefe
| 61152 ||  || — || July 5, 2000 || Anderson Mesa || LONEOS || — || align=right | 2.3 km || 
|-id=153 bgcolor=#fefefe
| 61153 ||  || — || July 5, 2000 || Anderson Mesa || LONEOS || FLO || align=right | 3.0 km || 
|-id=154 bgcolor=#E9E9E9
| 61154 ||  || — || July 5, 2000 || Anderson Mesa || LONEOS || GEF || align=right | 3.9 km || 
|-id=155 bgcolor=#fefefe
| 61155 ||  || — || July 5, 2000 || Anderson Mesa || LONEOS || — || align=right | 4.8 km || 
|-id=156 bgcolor=#E9E9E9
| 61156 ||  || — || July 5, 2000 || Anderson Mesa || LONEOS || — || align=right | 7.4 km || 
|-id=157 bgcolor=#fefefe
| 61157 ||  || — || July 5, 2000 || Anderson Mesa || LONEOS || ERI || align=right | 4.6 km || 
|-id=158 bgcolor=#E9E9E9
| 61158 ||  || — || July 5, 2000 || Anderson Mesa || LONEOS || — || align=right | 2.5 km || 
|-id=159 bgcolor=#fefefe
| 61159 ||  || — || July 5, 2000 || Anderson Mesa || LONEOS || NYS || align=right | 3.7 km || 
|-id=160 bgcolor=#E9E9E9
| 61160 ||  || — || July 5, 2000 || Anderson Mesa || LONEOS || — || align=right | 2.5 km || 
|-id=161 bgcolor=#E9E9E9
| 61161 ||  || — || July 5, 2000 || Anderson Mesa || LONEOS || — || align=right | 1.7 km || 
|-id=162 bgcolor=#fefefe
| 61162 ||  || — || July 5, 2000 || Anderson Mesa || LONEOS || FLO || align=right | 1.4 km || 
|-id=163 bgcolor=#fefefe
| 61163 ||  || — || July 5, 2000 || Anderson Mesa || LONEOS || NYS || align=right | 1.4 km || 
|-id=164 bgcolor=#fefefe
| 61164 ||  || — || July 5, 2000 || Anderson Mesa || LONEOS || FLO || align=right | 1.9 km || 
|-id=165 bgcolor=#E9E9E9
| 61165 ||  || — || July 5, 2000 || Anderson Mesa || LONEOS || — || align=right | 2.7 km || 
|-id=166 bgcolor=#E9E9E9
| 61166 ||  || — || July 5, 2000 || Anderson Mesa || LONEOS || — || align=right | 5.8 km || 
|-id=167 bgcolor=#E9E9E9
| 61167 ||  || — || July 6, 2000 || Kitt Peak || Spacewatch || — || align=right | 6.6 km || 
|-id=168 bgcolor=#fefefe
| 61168 ||  || — || July 6, 2000 || Kitt Peak || Spacewatch || — || align=right | 1.8 km || 
|-id=169 bgcolor=#fefefe
| 61169 ||  || — || July 6, 2000 || Kitt Peak || Spacewatch || V || align=right | 1.9 km || 
|-id=170 bgcolor=#E9E9E9
| 61170 ||  || — || July 6, 2000 || Kitt Peak || Spacewatch || — || align=right | 5.2 km || 
|-id=171 bgcolor=#fefefe
| 61171 ||  || — || July 6, 2000 || Anderson Mesa || LONEOS || V || align=right | 2.9 km || 
|-id=172 bgcolor=#E9E9E9
| 61172 ||  || — || July 7, 2000 || Anderson Mesa || LONEOS || — || align=right | 4.2 km || 
|-id=173 bgcolor=#fefefe
| 61173 ||  || — || July 7, 2000 || Socorro || LINEAR || FLO || align=right | 1.6 km || 
|-id=174 bgcolor=#fefefe
| 61174 ||  || — || July 7, 2000 || Anderson Mesa || LONEOS || FLO || align=right | 1.7 km || 
|-id=175 bgcolor=#E9E9E9
| 61175 ||  || — || July 7, 2000 || Anderson Mesa || LONEOS || — || align=right | 4.6 km || 
|-id=176 bgcolor=#fefefe
| 61176 ||  || — || July 5, 2000 || Kitt Peak || Spacewatch || — || align=right | 2.0 km || 
|-id=177 bgcolor=#fefefe
| 61177 ||  || — || July 5, 2000 || Anderson Mesa || LONEOS || FLO || align=right | 3.2 km || 
|-id=178 bgcolor=#fefefe
| 61178 ||  || — || July 5, 2000 || Kitt Peak || Spacewatch || MAS || align=right | 2.4 km || 
|-id=179 bgcolor=#fefefe
| 61179 ||  || — || July 4, 2000 || Anderson Mesa || LONEOS || NYS || align=right | 2.0 km || 
|-id=180 bgcolor=#fefefe
| 61180 ||  || — || July 4, 2000 || Anderson Mesa || LONEOS || V || align=right | 2.1 km || 
|-id=181 bgcolor=#fefefe
| 61181 ||  || — || July 4, 2000 || Anderson Mesa || LONEOS || NYS || align=right | 1.2 km || 
|-id=182 bgcolor=#E9E9E9
| 61182 ||  || — || July 4, 2000 || Anderson Mesa || LONEOS || RAF || align=right | 3.4 km || 
|-id=183 bgcolor=#fefefe
| 61183 ||  || — || July 4, 2000 || Anderson Mesa || LONEOS || FLO || align=right | 1.5 km || 
|-id=184 bgcolor=#E9E9E9
| 61184 ||  || — || July 4, 2000 || Anderson Mesa || LONEOS || — || align=right | 4.8 km || 
|-id=185 bgcolor=#d6d6d6
| 61185 ||  || — || July 4, 2000 || Anderson Mesa || LONEOS || EOS || align=right | 4.2 km || 
|-id=186 bgcolor=#E9E9E9
| 61186 ||  || — || July 4, 2000 || Anderson Mesa || LONEOS || — || align=right | 4.6 km || 
|-id=187 bgcolor=#E9E9E9
| 61187 ||  || — || July 4, 2000 || Anderson Mesa || LONEOS || — || align=right | 3.0 km || 
|-id=188 bgcolor=#fefefe
| 61188 ||  || — || July 4, 2000 || Anderson Mesa || LONEOS || MAS || align=right | 1.8 km || 
|-id=189 bgcolor=#fefefe
| 61189 Ohsadaharu ||  ||  || July 8, 2000 || Bisei SG Center || BATTeRS || V || align=right | 3.5 km || 
|-id=190 bgcolor=#fefefe
| 61190 Johnschutt ||  ||  || July 1, 2000 || Anza || M. Collins, M. White || — || align=right | 2.4 km || 
|-id=191 bgcolor=#fefefe
| 61191 || 2000 OA || — || July 21, 2000 || Prescott || P. G. Comba || — || align=right | 1.8 km || 
|-id=192 bgcolor=#fefefe
| 61192 || 2000 OU || — || July 23, 2000 || Farpoint || G. Hug || — || align=right | 3.7 km || 
|-id=193 bgcolor=#fefefe
| 61193 ||  || — || July 26, 2000 || Prescott || P. G. Comba || — || align=right | 2.0 km || 
|-id=194 bgcolor=#fefefe
| 61194 ||  || — || July 24, 2000 || Farpoint || Farpoint Obs. || V || align=right | 2.0 km || 
|-id=195 bgcolor=#fefefe
| 61195 Martinoli ||  ||  || July 28, 2000 || Gnosca || S. Sposetti || — || align=right | 2.3 km || 
|-id=196 bgcolor=#fefefe
| 61196 ||  || — || July 23, 2000 || Socorro || LINEAR || — || align=right | 3.7 km || 
|-id=197 bgcolor=#d6d6d6
| 61197 ||  || — || July 23, 2000 || Socorro || LINEAR || — || align=right | 15 km || 
|-id=198 bgcolor=#fefefe
| 61198 ||  || — || July 24, 2000 || Socorro || LINEAR || FLO || align=right | 1.7 km || 
|-id=199 bgcolor=#fefefe
| 61199 ||  || — || July 24, 2000 || Socorro || LINEAR || — || align=right | 1.7 km || 
|-id=200 bgcolor=#fefefe
| 61200 ||  || — || July 24, 2000 || Socorro || LINEAR || — || align=right | 2.3 km || 
|}

61201–61300 

|-bgcolor=#fefefe
| 61201 ||  || — || July 24, 2000 || Socorro || LINEAR || V || align=right | 1.9 km || 
|-id=202 bgcolor=#fefefe
| 61202 ||  || — || July 24, 2000 || Socorro || LINEAR || V || align=right | 2.1 km || 
|-id=203 bgcolor=#fefefe
| 61203 ||  || — || July 24, 2000 || Socorro || LINEAR || — || align=right | 2.8 km || 
|-id=204 bgcolor=#fefefe
| 61204 ||  || — || July 24, 2000 || Socorro || LINEAR || — || align=right | 2.4 km || 
|-id=205 bgcolor=#fefefe
| 61205 ||  || — || July 29, 2000 || Socorro || LINEAR || — || align=right | 2.7 km || 
|-id=206 bgcolor=#fefefe
| 61206 ||  || — || July 29, 2000 || Socorro || LINEAR || — || align=right | 2.6 km || 
|-id=207 bgcolor=#E9E9E9
| 61207 ||  || — || July 30, 2000 || Socorro || LINEAR || IAN || align=right | 3.9 km || 
|-id=208 bgcolor=#fefefe
| 61208 Stonařov ||  ||  || July 30, 2000 || Kleť || J. Tichá, M. Tichý || FLO || align=right | 1.7 km || 
|-id=209 bgcolor=#fefefe
| 61209 ||  || — || July 30, 2000 || Reedy Creek || J. Broughton || — || align=right | 2.0 km || 
|-id=210 bgcolor=#fefefe
| 61210 ||  || — || July 23, 2000 || Socorro || LINEAR || — || align=right | 1.9 km || 
|-id=211 bgcolor=#fefefe
| 61211 ||  || — || July 23, 2000 || Socorro || LINEAR || — || align=right | 3.5 km || 
|-id=212 bgcolor=#fefefe
| 61212 ||  || — || July 23, 2000 || Socorro || LINEAR || FLO || align=right | 2.2 km || 
|-id=213 bgcolor=#fefefe
| 61213 ||  || — || July 23, 2000 || Socorro || LINEAR || — || align=right | 1.3 km || 
|-id=214 bgcolor=#fefefe
| 61214 ||  || — || July 23, 2000 || Socorro || LINEAR || MAS || align=right | 3.0 km || 
|-id=215 bgcolor=#fefefe
| 61215 ||  || — || July 23, 2000 || Socorro || LINEAR || — || align=right | 4.5 km || 
|-id=216 bgcolor=#fefefe
| 61216 ||  || — || July 23, 2000 || Socorro || LINEAR || — || align=right | 1.6 km || 
|-id=217 bgcolor=#fefefe
| 61217 ||  || — || July 23, 2000 || Socorro || LINEAR || — || align=right | 2.1 km || 
|-id=218 bgcolor=#fefefe
| 61218 ||  || — || July 23, 2000 || Socorro || LINEAR || — || align=right | 2.7 km || 
|-id=219 bgcolor=#fefefe
| 61219 ||  || — || July 23, 2000 || Socorro || LINEAR || — || align=right | 1.2 km || 
|-id=220 bgcolor=#fefefe
| 61220 ||  || — || July 23, 2000 || Socorro || LINEAR || NYS || align=right | 1.0 km || 
|-id=221 bgcolor=#fefefe
| 61221 ||  || — || July 23, 2000 || Socorro || LINEAR || — || align=right | 2.0 km || 
|-id=222 bgcolor=#fefefe
| 61222 ||  || — || July 23, 2000 || Socorro || LINEAR || — || align=right | 2.4 km || 
|-id=223 bgcolor=#fefefe
| 61223 ||  || — || July 23, 2000 || Socorro || LINEAR || — || align=right | 2.7 km || 
|-id=224 bgcolor=#fefefe
| 61224 ||  || — || July 23, 2000 || Socorro || LINEAR || — || align=right | 4.0 km || 
|-id=225 bgcolor=#E9E9E9
| 61225 ||  || — || July 23, 2000 || Socorro || LINEAR || — || align=right | 5.5 km || 
|-id=226 bgcolor=#E9E9E9
| 61226 ||  || — || July 23, 2000 || Socorro || LINEAR || HNS || align=right | 5.5 km || 
|-id=227 bgcolor=#fefefe
| 61227 ||  || — || July 23, 2000 || Socorro || LINEAR || — || align=right | 1.8 km || 
|-id=228 bgcolor=#fefefe
| 61228 ||  || — || July 23, 2000 || Socorro || LINEAR || FLO || align=right | 2.2 km || 
|-id=229 bgcolor=#fefefe
| 61229 ||  || — || July 23, 2000 || Socorro || LINEAR || NYS || align=right | 1.5 km || 
|-id=230 bgcolor=#fefefe
| 61230 ||  || — || July 23, 2000 || Socorro || LINEAR || — || align=right | 1.5 km || 
|-id=231 bgcolor=#fefefe
| 61231 ||  || — || July 23, 2000 || Socorro || LINEAR || V || align=right | 1.5 km || 
|-id=232 bgcolor=#fefefe
| 61232 ||  || — || July 23, 2000 || Socorro || LINEAR || — || align=right | 1.8 km || 
|-id=233 bgcolor=#E9E9E9
| 61233 ||  || — || July 23, 2000 || Socorro || LINEAR || — || align=right | 2.7 km || 
|-id=234 bgcolor=#fefefe
| 61234 ||  || — || July 23, 2000 || Socorro || LINEAR || — || align=right | 4.8 km || 
|-id=235 bgcolor=#fefefe
| 61235 ||  || — || July 23, 2000 || Socorro || LINEAR || — || align=right | 2.8 km || 
|-id=236 bgcolor=#fefefe
| 61236 ||  || — || July 23, 2000 || Socorro || LINEAR || NYS || align=right | 2.7 km || 
|-id=237 bgcolor=#fefefe
| 61237 ||  || — || July 23, 2000 || Socorro || LINEAR || MAS || align=right | 1.9 km || 
|-id=238 bgcolor=#fefefe
| 61238 ||  || — || July 23, 2000 || Socorro || LINEAR || — || align=right | 1.9 km || 
|-id=239 bgcolor=#fefefe
| 61239 ||  || — || July 23, 2000 || Socorro || LINEAR || — || align=right | 1.9 km || 
|-id=240 bgcolor=#fefefe
| 61240 ||  || — || July 23, 2000 || Socorro || LINEAR || NYS || align=right | 2.2 km || 
|-id=241 bgcolor=#fefefe
| 61241 ||  || — || July 23, 2000 || Socorro || LINEAR || — || align=right | 2.0 km || 
|-id=242 bgcolor=#E9E9E9
| 61242 ||  || — || July 23, 2000 || Socorro || LINEAR || — || align=right | 3.0 km || 
|-id=243 bgcolor=#E9E9E9
| 61243 ||  || — || July 23, 2000 || Socorro || LINEAR || PAD || align=right | 5.3 km || 
|-id=244 bgcolor=#fefefe
| 61244 ||  || — || July 30, 2000 || Socorro || LINEAR || V || align=right | 1.9 km || 
|-id=245 bgcolor=#fefefe
| 61245 ||  || — || July 31, 2000 || Socorro || LINEAR || — || align=right | 2.0 km || 
|-id=246 bgcolor=#fefefe
| 61246 ||  || — || July 23, 2000 || Socorro || LINEAR || FLO || align=right | 1.6 km || 
|-id=247 bgcolor=#E9E9E9
| 61247 ||  || — || July 23, 2000 || Socorro || LINEAR || — || align=right | 3.6 km || 
|-id=248 bgcolor=#E9E9E9
| 61248 ||  || — || July 23, 2000 || Socorro || LINEAR || — || align=right | 2.7 km || 
|-id=249 bgcolor=#fefefe
| 61249 ||  || — || July 23, 2000 || Socorro || LINEAR || — || align=right | 2.8 km || 
|-id=250 bgcolor=#E9E9E9
| 61250 ||  || — || July 23, 2000 || Socorro || LINEAR || MAR || align=right | 2.7 km || 
|-id=251 bgcolor=#fefefe
| 61251 ||  || — || July 23, 2000 || Socorro || LINEAR || — || align=right | 2.3 km || 
|-id=252 bgcolor=#E9E9E9
| 61252 ||  || — || July 23, 2000 || Socorro || LINEAR || — || align=right | 2.8 km || 
|-id=253 bgcolor=#fefefe
| 61253 ||  || — || July 23, 2000 || Socorro || LINEAR || V || align=right | 3.3 km || 
|-id=254 bgcolor=#fefefe
| 61254 ||  || — || July 23, 2000 || Socorro || LINEAR || V || align=right | 2.0 km || 
|-id=255 bgcolor=#fefefe
| 61255 ||  || — || July 23, 2000 || Socorro || LINEAR || — || align=right | 2.2 km || 
|-id=256 bgcolor=#FA8072
| 61256 ||  || — || July 23, 2000 || Socorro || LINEAR || — || align=right | 1.8 km || 
|-id=257 bgcolor=#fefefe
| 61257 ||  || — || July 23, 2000 || Socorro || LINEAR || MAS || align=right | 1.5 km || 
|-id=258 bgcolor=#fefefe
| 61258 ||  || — || July 23, 2000 || Socorro || LINEAR || — || align=right | 1.5 km || 
|-id=259 bgcolor=#E9E9E9
| 61259 ||  || — || July 23, 2000 || Socorro || LINEAR || — || align=right | 3.0 km || 
|-id=260 bgcolor=#fefefe
| 61260 ||  || — || July 23, 2000 || Socorro || LINEAR || NYS || align=right | 1.4 km || 
|-id=261 bgcolor=#fefefe
| 61261 ||  || — || July 23, 2000 || Socorro || LINEAR || — || align=right | 4.5 km || 
|-id=262 bgcolor=#fefefe
| 61262 ||  || — || July 29, 2000 || Socorro || LINEAR || FLO || align=right | 1.8 km || 
|-id=263 bgcolor=#E9E9E9
| 61263 ||  || — || July 30, 2000 || Socorro || LINEAR || RAF || align=right | 2.4 km || 
|-id=264 bgcolor=#E9E9E9
| 61264 ||  || — || July 30, 2000 || Socorro || LINEAR || — || align=right | 5.1 km || 
|-id=265 bgcolor=#fefefe
| 61265 ||  || — || July 30, 2000 || Socorro || LINEAR || — || align=right | 2.0 km || 
|-id=266 bgcolor=#E9E9E9
| 61266 ||  || — || July 30, 2000 || Socorro || LINEAR || — || align=right | 3.9 km || 
|-id=267 bgcolor=#fefefe
| 61267 ||  || — || July 30, 2000 || Socorro || LINEAR || V || align=right | 1.9 km || 
|-id=268 bgcolor=#d6d6d6
| 61268 ||  || — || July 30, 2000 || Socorro || LINEAR || MEL || align=right | 8.2 km || 
|-id=269 bgcolor=#fefefe
| 61269 ||  || — || July 30, 2000 || Socorro || LINEAR || — || align=right | 2.7 km || 
|-id=270 bgcolor=#fefefe
| 61270 ||  || — || July 30, 2000 || Socorro || LINEAR || V || align=right | 1.2 km || 
|-id=271 bgcolor=#fefefe
| 61271 ||  || — || July 30, 2000 || Socorro || LINEAR || — || align=right | 2.8 km || 
|-id=272 bgcolor=#fefefe
| 61272 ||  || — || July 30, 2000 || Socorro || LINEAR || V || align=right | 1.7 km || 
|-id=273 bgcolor=#fefefe
| 61273 ||  || — || July 30, 2000 || Socorro || LINEAR || V || align=right | 1.4 km || 
|-id=274 bgcolor=#fefefe
| 61274 ||  || — || July 30, 2000 || Socorro || LINEAR || — || align=right | 1.5 km || 
|-id=275 bgcolor=#E9E9E9
| 61275 ||  || — || July 30, 2000 || Socorro || LINEAR || — || align=right | 4.5 km || 
|-id=276 bgcolor=#fefefe
| 61276 ||  || — || July 30, 2000 || Socorro || LINEAR || — || align=right | 2.3 km || 
|-id=277 bgcolor=#E9E9E9
| 61277 ||  || — || July 30, 2000 || Socorro || LINEAR || — || align=right | 2.6 km || 
|-id=278 bgcolor=#fefefe
| 61278 ||  || — || July 30, 2000 || Socorro || LINEAR || — || align=right | 2.2 km || 
|-id=279 bgcolor=#fefefe
| 61279 ||  || — || July 30, 2000 || Socorro || LINEAR || — || align=right | 1.8 km || 
|-id=280 bgcolor=#fefefe
| 61280 ||  || — || July 30, 2000 || Socorro || LINEAR || — || align=right | 2.0 km || 
|-id=281 bgcolor=#fefefe
| 61281 ||  || — || July 30, 2000 || Socorro || LINEAR || FLO || align=right | 1.2 km || 
|-id=282 bgcolor=#fefefe
| 61282 ||  || — || July 24, 2000 || Socorro || LINEAR || V || align=right | 1.9 km || 
|-id=283 bgcolor=#E9E9E9
| 61283 ||  || — || July 30, 2000 || Socorro || LINEAR || — || align=right | 6.0 km || 
|-id=284 bgcolor=#E9E9E9
| 61284 ||  || — || July 30, 2000 || Socorro || LINEAR || — || align=right | 3.7 km || 
|-id=285 bgcolor=#E9E9E9
| 61285 ||  || — || July 30, 2000 || Socorro || LINEAR || GEF || align=right | 3.2 km || 
|-id=286 bgcolor=#fefefe
| 61286 ||  || — || July 30, 2000 || Socorro || LINEAR || — || align=right | 1.8 km || 
|-id=287 bgcolor=#E9E9E9
| 61287 ||  || — || July 30, 2000 || Socorro || LINEAR || — || align=right | 3.2 km || 
|-id=288 bgcolor=#fefefe
| 61288 ||  || — || July 30, 2000 || Socorro || LINEAR || — || align=right | 3.0 km || 
|-id=289 bgcolor=#fefefe
| 61289 ||  || — || July 30, 2000 || Socorro || LINEAR || — || align=right | 1.7 km || 
|-id=290 bgcolor=#E9E9E9
| 61290 ||  || — || July 30, 2000 || Socorro || LINEAR || GEF || align=right | 4.6 km || 
|-id=291 bgcolor=#fefefe
| 61291 ||  || — || July 30, 2000 || Socorro || LINEAR || — || align=right | 2.9 km || 
|-id=292 bgcolor=#fefefe
| 61292 ||  || — || July 30, 2000 || Socorro || LINEAR || V || align=right | 3.5 km || 
|-id=293 bgcolor=#fefefe
| 61293 ||  || — || July 30, 2000 || Socorro || LINEAR || — || align=right | 3.2 km || 
|-id=294 bgcolor=#fefefe
| 61294 ||  || — || July 30, 2000 || Socorro || LINEAR || V || align=right | 1.7 km || 
|-id=295 bgcolor=#fefefe
| 61295 ||  || — || July 30, 2000 || Socorro || LINEAR || — || align=right | 2.7 km || 
|-id=296 bgcolor=#fefefe
| 61296 ||  || — || July 30, 2000 || Socorro || LINEAR || — || align=right | 1.7 km || 
|-id=297 bgcolor=#fefefe
| 61297 ||  || — || July 30, 2000 || Socorro || LINEAR || — || align=right | 1.7 km || 
|-id=298 bgcolor=#E9E9E9
| 61298 ||  || — || July 31, 2000 || Socorro || LINEAR || — || align=right | 5.4 km || 
|-id=299 bgcolor=#fefefe
| 61299 ||  || — || July 31, 2000 || Socorro || LINEAR || — || align=right | 2.5 km || 
|-id=300 bgcolor=#fefefe
| 61300 ||  || — || July 31, 2000 || Socorro || LINEAR || NYS || align=right | 2.2 km || 
|}

61301–61400 

|-bgcolor=#E9E9E9
| 61301 ||  || — || July 31, 2000 || Socorro || LINEAR || EUN || align=right | 3.4 km || 
|-id=302 bgcolor=#fefefe
| 61302 ||  || — || July 31, 2000 || Socorro || LINEAR || — || align=right | 2.4 km || 
|-id=303 bgcolor=#fefefe
| 61303 ||  || — || July 31, 2000 || Socorro || LINEAR || — || align=right | 2.5 km || 
|-id=304 bgcolor=#fefefe
| 61304 ||  || — || July 31, 2000 || Socorro || LINEAR || NYS || align=right | 1.9 km || 
|-id=305 bgcolor=#E9E9E9
| 61305 ||  || — || July 31, 2000 || Socorro || LINEAR || — || align=right | 4.8 km || 
|-id=306 bgcolor=#fefefe
| 61306 ||  || — || July 31, 2000 || Socorro || LINEAR || — || align=right | 2.2 km || 
|-id=307 bgcolor=#E9E9E9
| 61307 ||  || — || July 31, 2000 || Socorro || LINEAR || MAR || align=right | 4.0 km || 
|-id=308 bgcolor=#fefefe
| 61308 ||  || — || July 31, 2000 || Socorro || LINEAR || — || align=right | 2.4 km || 
|-id=309 bgcolor=#fefefe
| 61309 ||  || — || July 31, 2000 || Socorro || LINEAR || CIM || align=right | 6.8 km || 
|-id=310 bgcolor=#fefefe
| 61310 ||  || — || July 31, 2000 || Socorro || LINEAR || — || align=right | 2.0 km || 
|-id=311 bgcolor=#fefefe
| 61311 ||  || — || July 31, 2000 || Socorro || LINEAR || NYS || align=right | 1.9 km || 
|-id=312 bgcolor=#fefefe
| 61312 ||  || — || July 31, 2000 || Socorro || LINEAR || NYS || align=right | 3.0 km || 
|-id=313 bgcolor=#E9E9E9
| 61313 ||  || — || July 30, 2000 || Socorro || LINEAR || — || align=right | 3.4 km || 
|-id=314 bgcolor=#fefefe
| 61314 ||  || — || July 30, 2000 || Socorro || LINEAR || — || align=right | 2.9 km || 
|-id=315 bgcolor=#fefefe
| 61315 ||  || — || July 30, 2000 || Socorro || LINEAR || — || align=right | 4.7 km || 
|-id=316 bgcolor=#fefefe
| 61316 ||  || — || July 30, 2000 || Socorro || LINEAR || — || align=right | 5.5 km || 
|-id=317 bgcolor=#E9E9E9
| 61317 ||  || — || July 30, 2000 || Socorro || LINEAR || — || align=right | 7.2 km || 
|-id=318 bgcolor=#fefefe
| 61318 ||  || — || July 30, 2000 || Socorro || LINEAR || — || align=right | 3.3 km || 
|-id=319 bgcolor=#E9E9E9
| 61319 ||  || — || July 30, 2000 || Socorro || LINEAR || EUN || align=right | 4.0 km || 
|-id=320 bgcolor=#fefefe
| 61320 ||  || — || July 31, 2000 || Socorro || LINEAR || — || align=right | 2.5 km || 
|-id=321 bgcolor=#fefefe
| 61321 ||  || — || July 29, 2000 || Anderson Mesa || LONEOS || FLO || align=right | 2.4 km || 
|-id=322 bgcolor=#fefefe
| 61322 ||  || — || July 29, 2000 || Anderson Mesa || LONEOS || MAS || align=right | 1.4 km || 
|-id=323 bgcolor=#fefefe
| 61323 ||  || — || July 29, 2000 || Anderson Mesa || LONEOS || — || align=right | 1.9 km || 
|-id=324 bgcolor=#fefefe
| 61324 ||  || — || July 29, 2000 || Anderson Mesa || LONEOS || NYS || align=right | 1.5 km || 
|-id=325 bgcolor=#d6d6d6
| 61325 ||  || — || July 29, 2000 || Anderson Mesa || LONEOS || — || align=right | 5.0 km || 
|-id=326 bgcolor=#fefefe
| 61326 ||  || — || July 29, 2000 || Anderson Mesa || LONEOS || — || align=right | 1.6 km || 
|-id=327 bgcolor=#E9E9E9
| 61327 ||  || — || July 29, 2000 || Anderson Mesa || LONEOS || — || align=right | 4.6 km || 
|-id=328 bgcolor=#d6d6d6
| 61328 ||  || — || July 29, 2000 || Anderson Mesa || LONEOS || — || align=right | 7.3 km || 
|-id=329 bgcolor=#d6d6d6
| 61329 ||  || — || July 29, 2000 || Anderson Mesa || LONEOS || EOS || align=right | 4.1 km || 
|-id=330 bgcolor=#fefefe
| 61330 ||  || — || July 29, 2000 || Anderson Mesa || LONEOS || NYS || align=right | 1.7 km || 
|-id=331 bgcolor=#fefefe
| 61331 ||  || — || July 29, 2000 || Anderson Mesa || LONEOS || — || align=right | 1.9 km || 
|-id=332 bgcolor=#fefefe
| 61332 ||  || — || July 29, 2000 || Anderson Mesa || LONEOS || — || align=right | 1.7 km || 
|-id=333 bgcolor=#E9E9E9
| 61333 ||  || — || July 29, 2000 || Anderson Mesa || LONEOS || — || align=right | 3.5 km || 
|-id=334 bgcolor=#fefefe
| 61334 ||  || — || July 29, 2000 || Anderson Mesa || LONEOS || FLO || align=right | 1.7 km || 
|-id=335 bgcolor=#E9E9E9
| 61335 ||  || — || July 29, 2000 || Anderson Mesa || LONEOS || — || align=right | 2.4 km || 
|-id=336 bgcolor=#fefefe
| 61336 ||  || — || July 23, 2000 || Socorro || LINEAR || — || align=right | 2.6 km || 
|-id=337 bgcolor=#E9E9E9
| 61337 ||  || — || July 29, 2000 || Cerro Tololo || M. W. Buie || — || align=right | 2.2 km || 
|-id=338 bgcolor=#d6d6d6
| 61338 || 2000 PK || — || August 1, 2000 || Bergisch Gladbach || W. Bickel || EOS || align=right | 5.1 km || 
|-id=339 bgcolor=#d6d6d6
| 61339 ||  || — || August 1, 2000 || Socorro || LINEAR || HYG || align=right | 6.4 km || 
|-id=340 bgcolor=#E9E9E9
| 61340 ||  || — || August 2, 2000 || Socorro || LINEAR || — || align=right | 5.7 km || 
|-id=341 bgcolor=#fefefe
| 61341 ||  || — || August 1, 2000 || Reedy Creek || J. Broughton || V || align=right | 1.5 km || 
|-id=342 bgcolor=#fefefe
| 61342 Lovejoy ||  ||  || August 3, 2000 || Loomberah || G. J. Garradd || NYS || align=right | 1.7 km || 
|-id=343 bgcolor=#FA8072
| 61343 ||  || — || August 2, 2000 || Socorro || LINEAR || — || align=right | 2.3 km || 
|-id=344 bgcolor=#fefefe
| 61344 ||  || — || August 3, 2000 || Bisei SG Center || BATTeRS || — || align=right | 1.6 km || 
|-id=345 bgcolor=#fefefe
| 61345 ||  || — || August 3, 2000 || Bergisch Gladbach || W. Bickel || NYS || align=right | 1.9 km || 
|-id=346 bgcolor=#E9E9E9
| 61346 ||  || — || August 3, 2000 || Socorro || LINEAR || — || align=right | 2.4 km || 
|-id=347 bgcolor=#E9E9E9
| 61347 ||  || — || August 3, 2000 || Socorro || LINEAR || — || align=right | 3.2 km || 
|-id=348 bgcolor=#E9E9E9
| 61348 ||  || — || August 4, 2000 || Socorro || LINEAR || MAR || align=right | 3.9 km || 
|-id=349 bgcolor=#E9E9E9
| 61349 ||  || — || August 6, 2000 || Siding Spring || R. H. McNaught || — || align=right | 3.1 km || 
|-id=350 bgcolor=#E9E9E9
| 61350 ||  || — || August 6, 2000 || Siding Spring || R. H. McNaught || — || align=right | 4.0 km || 
|-id=351 bgcolor=#fefefe
| 61351 ||  || — || August 9, 2000 || Ametlla de Mar || J. Nomen || MAS || align=right | 2.0 km || 
|-id=352 bgcolor=#E9E9E9
| 61352 ||  || — || August 1, 2000 || Socorro || LINEAR || — || align=right | 3.1 km || 
|-id=353 bgcolor=#fefefe
| 61353 ||  || — || August 1, 2000 || Socorro || LINEAR || — || align=right | 2.5 km || 
|-id=354 bgcolor=#E9E9E9
| 61354 ||  || — || August 1, 2000 || Socorro || LINEAR || — || align=right | 2.9 km || 
|-id=355 bgcolor=#d6d6d6
| 61355 ||  || — || August 1, 2000 || Socorro || LINEAR || — || align=right | 4.8 km || 
|-id=356 bgcolor=#E9E9E9
| 61356 ||  || — || August 1, 2000 || Socorro || LINEAR || EUN || align=right | 2.8 km || 
|-id=357 bgcolor=#E9E9E9
| 61357 ||  || — || August 1, 2000 || Socorro || LINEAR || — || align=right | 6.1 km || 
|-id=358 bgcolor=#E9E9E9
| 61358 ||  || — || August 2, 2000 || Socorro || LINEAR || — || align=right | 2.9 km || 
|-id=359 bgcolor=#E9E9E9
| 61359 ||  || — || August 1, 2000 || Socorro || LINEAR || — || align=right | 2.9 km || 
|-id=360 bgcolor=#E9E9E9
| 61360 ||  || — || August 1, 2000 || Socorro || LINEAR || — || align=right | 5.4 km || 
|-id=361 bgcolor=#E9E9E9
| 61361 ||  || — || August 1, 2000 || Socorro || LINEAR || — || align=right | 2.4 km || 
|-id=362 bgcolor=#fefefe
| 61362 ||  || — || August 1, 2000 || Socorro || LINEAR || — || align=right | 2.6 km || 
|-id=363 bgcolor=#fefefe
| 61363 ||  || — || August 1, 2000 || Socorro || LINEAR || V || align=right | 1.5 km || 
|-id=364 bgcolor=#fefefe
| 61364 ||  || — || August 1, 2000 || Socorro || LINEAR || FLO || align=right | 3.3 km || 
|-id=365 bgcolor=#fefefe
| 61365 ||  || — || August 1, 2000 || Socorro || LINEAR || NYS || align=right | 2.0 km || 
|-id=366 bgcolor=#E9E9E9
| 61366 ||  || — || August 1, 2000 || Socorro || LINEAR || — || align=right | 5.8 km || 
|-id=367 bgcolor=#E9E9E9
| 61367 ||  || — || August 1, 2000 || Socorro || LINEAR || — || align=right | 5.3 km || 
|-id=368 bgcolor=#fefefe
| 61368 ||  || — || August 1, 2000 || Socorro || LINEAR || — || align=right | 1.8 km || 
|-id=369 bgcolor=#E9E9E9
| 61369 ||  || — || August 1, 2000 || Socorro || LINEAR || GEF || align=right | 4.1 km || 
|-id=370 bgcolor=#E9E9E9
| 61370 ||  || — || August 2, 2000 || Socorro || LINEAR || — || align=right | 2.1 km || 
|-id=371 bgcolor=#fefefe
| 61371 ||  || — || August 2, 2000 || Socorro || LINEAR || — || align=right | 2.3 km || 
|-id=372 bgcolor=#fefefe
| 61372 ||  || — || August 2, 2000 || Socorro || LINEAR || NYS || align=right | 1.6 km || 
|-id=373 bgcolor=#fefefe
| 61373 ||  || — || August 2, 2000 || Socorro || LINEAR || V || align=right | 1.6 km || 
|-id=374 bgcolor=#fefefe
| 61374 ||  || — || August 3, 2000 || Socorro || LINEAR || — || align=right | 2.5 km || 
|-id=375 bgcolor=#E9E9E9
| 61375 ||  || — || August 3, 2000 || Socorro || LINEAR || — || align=right | 3.2 km || 
|-id=376 bgcolor=#fefefe
| 61376 ||  || — || August 4, 2000 || Haleakala || NEAT || — || align=right | 3.5 km || 
|-id=377 bgcolor=#fefefe
| 61377 ||  || — || August 3, 2000 || Socorro || LINEAR || V || align=right | 1.4 km || 
|-id=378 bgcolor=#fefefe
| 61378 ||  || — || August 2, 2000 || Socorro || LINEAR || MAS || align=right | 2.2 km || 
|-id=379 bgcolor=#E9E9E9
| 61379 ||  || — || August 1, 2000 || Socorro || LINEAR || RAF || align=right | 2.7 km || 
|-id=380 bgcolor=#fefefe
| 61380 ||  || — || August 1, 2000 || Socorro || LINEAR || V || align=right | 1.6 km || 
|-id=381 bgcolor=#E9E9E9
| 61381 ||  || — || August 1, 2000 || Socorro || LINEAR || WIT || align=right | 2.3 km || 
|-id=382 bgcolor=#fefefe
| 61382 ||  || — || August 1, 2000 || Socorro || LINEAR || — || align=right | 2.3 km || 
|-id=383 bgcolor=#fefefe
| 61383 || 2000 QB || — || August 20, 2000 || Prescott || P. G. Comba || MAS || align=right | 1.6 km || 
|-id=384 bgcolor=#fefefe
| 61384 Arturoromer || 2000 QW ||  || August 22, 2000 || Gnosca || S. Sposetti || NYS || align=right | 1.5 km || 
|-id=385 bgcolor=#E9E9E9
| 61385 ||  || — || August 23, 2000 || Reedy Creek || J. Broughton || — || align=right | 2.5 km || 
|-id=386 bgcolor=#fefefe
| 61386 Namikoshi ||  ||  || August 24, 2000 || Gnosca || S. Sposetti || NYS || align=right | 1.9 km || 
|-id=387 bgcolor=#E9E9E9
| 61387 ||  || — || August 24, 2000 || Socorro || LINEAR || — || align=right | 4.9 km || 
|-id=388 bgcolor=#E9E9E9
| 61388 ||  || — || August 24, 2000 || Socorro || LINEAR || — || align=right | 4.2 km || 
|-id=389 bgcolor=#fefefe
| 61389 ||  || — || August 24, 2000 || Socorro || LINEAR || V || align=right | 1.5 km || 
|-id=390 bgcolor=#fefefe
| 61390 ||  || — || August 24, 2000 || Socorro || LINEAR || — || align=right | 1.7 km || 
|-id=391 bgcolor=#E9E9E9
| 61391 ||  || — || August 24, 2000 || Socorro || LINEAR || — || align=right | 1.8 km || 
|-id=392 bgcolor=#fefefe
| 61392 ||  || — || August 24, 2000 || Socorro || LINEAR || — || align=right | 1.8 km || 
|-id=393 bgcolor=#fefefe
| 61393 ||  || — || August 24, 2000 || Socorro || LINEAR || NYS || align=right | 4.4 km || 
|-id=394 bgcolor=#fefefe
| 61394 ||  || — || August 24, 2000 || Socorro || LINEAR || — || align=right | 1.9 km || 
|-id=395 bgcolor=#fefefe
| 61395 ||  || — || August 24, 2000 || Socorro || LINEAR || NYS || align=right | 1.5 km || 
|-id=396 bgcolor=#E9E9E9
| 61396 ||  || — || August 24, 2000 || Socorro || LINEAR || HNA || align=right | 5.1 km || 
|-id=397 bgcolor=#fefefe
| 61397 ||  || — || August 24, 2000 || Socorro || LINEAR || NYS || align=right | 2.4 km || 
|-id=398 bgcolor=#E9E9E9
| 61398 ||  || — || August 24, 2000 || Socorro || LINEAR || — || align=right | 2.5 km || 
|-id=399 bgcolor=#fefefe
| 61399 ||  || — || August 24, 2000 || Socorro || LINEAR || — || align=right | 1.9 km || 
|-id=400 bgcolor=#E9E9E9
| 61400 Voxandreae ||  ||  || August 25, 2000 || Emerald Lane || L. Ball || — || align=right | 3.8 km || 
|}

61401–61500 

|-bgcolor=#E9E9E9
| 61401 Schiff ||  ||  || August 25, 2000 || Gnosca || S. Sposetti || — || align=right | 2.7 km || 
|-id=402 bgcolor=#E9E9E9
| 61402 Franciseveritt ||  ||  || August 25, 2000 || Gnosca || S. Sposetti || — || align=right | 1.6 km || 
|-id=403 bgcolor=#E9E9E9
| 61403 ||  || — || August 25, 2000 || Oakley || C. Wolfe, E. Bettelheim || — || align=right | 7.1 km || 
|-id=404 bgcolor=#E9E9E9
| 61404 Očenášek ||  ||  || August 26, 2000 || Ondřejov || P. Pravec, P. Kušnirák || — || align=right | 6.5 km || 
|-id=405 bgcolor=#E9E9E9
| 61405 ||  || — || August 24, 2000 || Bergisch Gladbach || W. Bickel || — || align=right | 2.9 km || 
|-id=406 bgcolor=#fefefe
| 61406 ||  || — || August 24, 2000 || Socorro || LINEAR || — || align=right | 2.0 km || 
|-id=407 bgcolor=#E9E9E9
| 61407 ||  || — || August 24, 2000 || Socorro || LINEAR || — || align=right | 2.1 km || 
|-id=408 bgcolor=#E9E9E9
| 61408 ||  || — || August 24, 2000 || Socorro || LINEAR || — || align=right | 3.0 km || 
|-id=409 bgcolor=#E9E9E9
| 61409 ||  || — || August 24, 2000 || Socorro || LINEAR || — || align=right | 3.6 km || 
|-id=410 bgcolor=#fefefe
| 61410 ||  || — || August 24, 2000 || Socorro || LINEAR || — || align=right | 1.7 km || 
|-id=411 bgcolor=#fefefe
| 61411 ||  || — || August 24, 2000 || Socorro || LINEAR || — || align=right | 2.5 km || 
|-id=412 bgcolor=#d6d6d6
| 61412 ||  || — || August 24, 2000 || Socorro || LINEAR || — || align=right | 6.4 km || 
|-id=413 bgcolor=#fefefe
| 61413 ||  || — || August 24, 2000 || Socorro || LINEAR || — || align=right | 1.8 km || 
|-id=414 bgcolor=#fefefe
| 61414 ||  || — || August 24, 2000 || Socorro || LINEAR || NYS || align=right | 2.1 km || 
|-id=415 bgcolor=#E9E9E9
| 61415 ||  || — || August 24, 2000 || Socorro || LINEAR || — || align=right | 1.9 km || 
|-id=416 bgcolor=#FA8072
| 61416 ||  || — || August 24, 2000 || Socorro || LINEAR || — || align=right | 1.7 km || 
|-id=417 bgcolor=#fefefe
| 61417 ||  || — || August 24, 2000 || Socorro || LINEAR || KLI || align=right | 3.3 km || 
|-id=418 bgcolor=#d6d6d6
| 61418 ||  || — || August 24, 2000 || Socorro || LINEAR || HYG || align=right | 6.5 km || 
|-id=419 bgcolor=#fefefe
| 61419 ||  || — || August 24, 2000 || Socorro || LINEAR || — || align=right | 1.8 km || 
|-id=420 bgcolor=#E9E9E9
| 61420 ||  || — || August 24, 2000 || Socorro || LINEAR || — || align=right | 2.5 km || 
|-id=421 bgcolor=#E9E9E9
| 61421 ||  || — || August 24, 2000 || Socorro || LINEAR || — || align=right | 2.8 km || 
|-id=422 bgcolor=#d6d6d6
| 61422 ||  || — || August 24, 2000 || Socorro || LINEAR || KOR || align=right | 3.4 km || 
|-id=423 bgcolor=#d6d6d6
| 61423 ||  || — || August 24, 2000 || Socorro || LINEAR || THM || align=right | 6.3 km || 
|-id=424 bgcolor=#fefefe
| 61424 ||  || — || August 24, 2000 || Socorro || LINEAR || — || align=right | 1.4 km || 
|-id=425 bgcolor=#fefefe
| 61425 ||  || — || August 24, 2000 || Socorro || LINEAR || — || align=right | 3.2 km || 
|-id=426 bgcolor=#fefefe
| 61426 ||  || — || August 24, 2000 || Socorro || LINEAR || FLO || align=right | 2.9 km || 
|-id=427 bgcolor=#E9E9E9
| 61427 ||  || — || August 24, 2000 || Socorro || LINEAR || — || align=right | 2.2 km || 
|-id=428 bgcolor=#fefefe
| 61428 ||  || — || August 24, 2000 || Socorro || LINEAR || — || align=right | 1.4 km || 
|-id=429 bgcolor=#E9E9E9
| 61429 ||  || — || August 24, 2000 || Socorro || LINEAR || — || align=right | 2.2 km || 
|-id=430 bgcolor=#fefefe
| 61430 ||  || — || August 24, 2000 || Socorro || LINEAR || — || align=right | 5.0 km || 
|-id=431 bgcolor=#d6d6d6
| 61431 ||  || — || August 24, 2000 || Socorro || LINEAR || KOR || align=right | 5.0 km || 
|-id=432 bgcolor=#E9E9E9
| 61432 ||  || — || August 24, 2000 || Socorro || LINEAR || HOF || align=right | 5.0 km || 
|-id=433 bgcolor=#fefefe
| 61433 ||  || — || August 24, 2000 || Socorro || LINEAR || NYS || align=right | 1.5 km || 
|-id=434 bgcolor=#E9E9E9
| 61434 ||  || — || August 24, 2000 || Socorro || LINEAR || — || align=right | 2.4 km || 
|-id=435 bgcolor=#E9E9E9
| 61435 ||  || — || August 24, 2000 || Socorro || LINEAR || — || align=right | 3.9 km || 
|-id=436 bgcolor=#fefefe
| 61436 ||  || — || August 24, 2000 || Socorro || LINEAR || V || align=right | 1.9 km || 
|-id=437 bgcolor=#fefefe
| 61437 ||  || — || August 24, 2000 || Socorro || LINEAR || — || align=right | 4.7 km || 
|-id=438 bgcolor=#d6d6d6
| 61438 ||  || — || August 24, 2000 || Socorro || LINEAR || HYG || align=right | 6.8 km || 
|-id=439 bgcolor=#fefefe
| 61439 ||  || — || August 25, 2000 || Socorro || LINEAR || — || align=right | 2.2 km || 
|-id=440 bgcolor=#d6d6d6
| 61440 ||  || — || August 25, 2000 || Socorro || LINEAR || — || align=right | 3.4 km || 
|-id=441 bgcolor=#E9E9E9
| 61441 ||  || — || August 25, 2000 || Socorro || LINEAR || — || align=right | 3.8 km || 
|-id=442 bgcolor=#E9E9E9
| 61442 ||  || — || August 25, 2000 || Socorro || LINEAR || — || align=right | 2.6 km || 
|-id=443 bgcolor=#fefefe
| 61443 ||  || — || August 25, 2000 || Socorro || LINEAR || NYS || align=right | 1.8 km || 
|-id=444 bgcolor=#E9E9E9
| 61444 Katokimiko ||  ||  || August 25, 2000 || Bisei SG Center || BATTeRS || — || align=right | 2.4 km || 
|-id=445 bgcolor=#fefefe
| 61445 ||  || — || August 26, 2000 || Oakley || Oakley Obs. || NYS || align=right | 1.9 km || 
|-id=446 bgcolor=#E9E9E9
| 61446 ||  || — || August 24, 2000 || Socorro || LINEAR || — || align=right | 2.5 km || 
|-id=447 bgcolor=#fefefe
| 61447 ||  || — || August 24, 2000 || Socorro || LINEAR || — || align=right | 2.8 km || 
|-id=448 bgcolor=#fefefe
| 61448 ||  || — || August 24, 2000 || Socorro || LINEAR || — || align=right | 1.9 km || 
|-id=449 bgcolor=#E9E9E9
| 61449 ||  || — || August 24, 2000 || Socorro || LINEAR || — || align=right | 1.6 km || 
|-id=450 bgcolor=#d6d6d6
| 61450 ||  || — || August 24, 2000 || Socorro || LINEAR || — || align=right | 3.9 km || 
|-id=451 bgcolor=#d6d6d6
| 61451 ||  || — || August 24, 2000 || Socorro || LINEAR || THM || align=right | 6.7 km || 
|-id=452 bgcolor=#E9E9E9
| 61452 ||  || — || August 24, 2000 || Socorro || LINEAR || — || align=right | 1.8 km || 
|-id=453 bgcolor=#fefefe
| 61453 ||  || — || August 24, 2000 || Socorro || LINEAR || FLO || align=right | 1.9 km || 
|-id=454 bgcolor=#E9E9E9
| 61454 ||  || — || August 25, 2000 || Socorro || LINEAR || — || align=right | 3.2 km || 
|-id=455 bgcolor=#fefefe
| 61455 ||  || — || August 25, 2000 || Socorro || LINEAR || NYS || align=right | 6.2 km || 
|-id=456 bgcolor=#E9E9E9
| 61456 ||  || — || August 25, 2000 || Socorro || LINEAR || — || align=right | 3.8 km || 
|-id=457 bgcolor=#fefefe
| 61457 ||  || — || August 25, 2000 || Socorro || LINEAR || — || align=right | 1.8 km || 
|-id=458 bgcolor=#fefefe
| 61458 ||  || — || August 25, 2000 || Socorro || LINEAR || — || align=right | 3.8 km || 
|-id=459 bgcolor=#fefefe
| 61459 ||  || — || August 26, 2000 || Socorro || LINEAR || — || align=right | 3.2 km || 
|-id=460 bgcolor=#fefefe
| 61460 ||  || — || August 26, 2000 || Socorro || LINEAR || — || align=right | 1.4 km || 
|-id=461 bgcolor=#E9E9E9
| 61461 ||  || — || August 26, 2000 || Socorro || LINEAR || — || align=right | 5.6 km || 
|-id=462 bgcolor=#d6d6d6
| 61462 ||  || — || August 26, 2000 || Socorro || LINEAR || — || align=right | 3.7 km || 
|-id=463 bgcolor=#E9E9E9
| 61463 ||  || — || August 26, 2000 || Socorro || LINEAR || RAF || align=right | 3.2 km || 
|-id=464 bgcolor=#fefefe
| 61464 ||  || — || August 26, 2000 || Socorro || LINEAR || V || align=right | 2.1 km || 
|-id=465 bgcolor=#E9E9E9
| 61465 ||  || — || August 26, 2000 || Socorro || LINEAR || — || align=right | 2.6 km || 
|-id=466 bgcolor=#fefefe
| 61466 ||  || — || August 26, 2000 || Socorro || LINEAR || — || align=right | 3.1 km || 
|-id=467 bgcolor=#d6d6d6
| 61467 ||  || — || August 26, 2000 || Socorro || LINEAR || — || align=right | 7.3 km || 
|-id=468 bgcolor=#fefefe
| 61468 ||  || — || August 26, 2000 || Socorro || LINEAR || V || align=right | 1.4 km || 
|-id=469 bgcolor=#fefefe
| 61469 ||  || — || August 23, 2000 || Nachi-Katsuura || Y. Shimizu, T. Urata || — || align=right | 5.7 km || 
|-id=470 bgcolor=#E9E9E9
| 61470 ||  || — || August 27, 2000 || Bisei SG Center || BATTeRS || — || align=right | 3.2 km || 
|-id=471 bgcolor=#fefefe
| 61471 ||  || — || August 28, 2000 || Višnjan Observatory || K. Korlević || ERI || align=right | 4.4 km || 
|-id=472 bgcolor=#d6d6d6
| 61472 ||  || — || August 28, 2000 || Farra d'Isonzo || Farra d'Isonzo || THM || align=right | 8.1 km || 
|-id=473 bgcolor=#E9E9E9
| 61473 ||  || — || August 29, 2000 || Farra d'Isonzo || Farra d'Isonzo || HOF || align=right | 7.7 km || 
|-id=474 bgcolor=#E9E9E9
| 61474 ||  || — || August 24, 2000 || Socorro || LINEAR || EUN || align=right | 3.6 km || 
|-id=475 bgcolor=#d6d6d6
| 61475 ||  || — || August 24, 2000 || Socorro || LINEAR || — || align=right | 5.8 km || 
|-id=476 bgcolor=#E9E9E9
| 61476 ||  || — || August 24, 2000 || Socorro || LINEAR || — || align=right | 3.7 km || 
|-id=477 bgcolor=#E9E9E9
| 61477 ||  || — || August 24, 2000 || Socorro || LINEAR || — || align=right | 6.2 km || 
|-id=478 bgcolor=#fefefe
| 61478 ||  || — || August 24, 2000 || Socorro || LINEAR || — || align=right | 1.6 km || 
|-id=479 bgcolor=#fefefe
| 61479 ||  || — || August 24, 2000 || Socorro || LINEAR || — || align=right | 2.8 km || 
|-id=480 bgcolor=#d6d6d6
| 61480 ||  || — || August 24, 2000 || Socorro || LINEAR || EOS || align=right | 4.8 km || 
|-id=481 bgcolor=#E9E9E9
| 61481 ||  || — || August 24, 2000 || Socorro || LINEAR || HOF || align=right | 6.9 km || 
|-id=482 bgcolor=#fefefe
| 61482 ||  || — || August 24, 2000 || Socorro || LINEAR || — || align=right | 1.9 km || 
|-id=483 bgcolor=#E9E9E9
| 61483 ||  || — || August 24, 2000 || Socorro || LINEAR || — || align=right | 5.0 km || 
|-id=484 bgcolor=#d6d6d6
| 61484 ||  || — || August 24, 2000 || Socorro || LINEAR || TEL || align=right | 3.0 km || 
|-id=485 bgcolor=#E9E9E9
| 61485 ||  || — || August 24, 2000 || Socorro || LINEAR || — || align=right | 2.4 km || 
|-id=486 bgcolor=#d6d6d6
| 61486 ||  || — || August 24, 2000 || Socorro || LINEAR || KOR || align=right | 3.1 km || 
|-id=487 bgcolor=#E9E9E9
| 61487 ||  || — || August 24, 2000 || Socorro || LINEAR || — || align=right | 2.9 km || 
|-id=488 bgcolor=#fefefe
| 61488 ||  || — || August 24, 2000 || Socorro || LINEAR || — || align=right | 2.1 km || 
|-id=489 bgcolor=#d6d6d6
| 61489 ||  || — || August 24, 2000 || Socorro || LINEAR || KOR || align=right | 2.8 km || 
|-id=490 bgcolor=#E9E9E9
| 61490 ||  || — || August 24, 2000 || Socorro || LINEAR || PAD || align=right | 4.5 km || 
|-id=491 bgcolor=#E9E9E9
| 61491 ||  || — || August 24, 2000 || Socorro || LINEAR || — || align=right | 2.2 km || 
|-id=492 bgcolor=#fefefe
| 61492 ||  || — || August 24, 2000 || Socorro || LINEAR || MAS || align=right | 2.7 km || 
|-id=493 bgcolor=#E9E9E9
| 61493 ||  || — || August 24, 2000 || Socorro || LINEAR || — || align=right | 2.3 km || 
|-id=494 bgcolor=#E9E9E9
| 61494 ||  || — || August 24, 2000 || Socorro || LINEAR || — || align=right | 3.0 km || 
|-id=495 bgcolor=#fefefe
| 61495 ||  || — || August 24, 2000 || Socorro || LINEAR || — || align=right | 1.6 km || 
|-id=496 bgcolor=#E9E9E9
| 61496 ||  || — || August 24, 2000 || Socorro || LINEAR || — || align=right | 4.0 km || 
|-id=497 bgcolor=#d6d6d6
| 61497 ||  || — || August 24, 2000 || Socorro || LINEAR || KOR || align=right | 2.5 km || 
|-id=498 bgcolor=#E9E9E9
| 61498 ||  || — || August 24, 2000 || Socorro || LINEAR || MAR || align=right | 2.8 km || 
|-id=499 bgcolor=#d6d6d6
| 61499 ||  || — || August 24, 2000 || Socorro || LINEAR || KOR || align=right | 2.7 km || 
|-id=500 bgcolor=#fefefe
| 61500 ||  || — || August 24, 2000 || Socorro || LINEAR || NYS || align=right | 4.4 km || 
|}

61501–61600 

|-bgcolor=#fefefe
| 61501 ||  || — || August 24, 2000 || Socorro || LINEAR || NYS || align=right | 4.2 km || 
|-id=502 bgcolor=#d6d6d6
| 61502 ||  || — || August 25, 2000 || Socorro || LINEAR || — || align=right | 4.9 km || 
|-id=503 bgcolor=#fefefe
| 61503 ||  || — || August 25, 2000 || Socorro || LINEAR || — || align=right | 1.9 km || 
|-id=504 bgcolor=#fefefe
| 61504 ||  || — || August 25, 2000 || Socorro || LINEAR || — || align=right | 1.9 km || 
|-id=505 bgcolor=#fefefe
| 61505 ||  || — || August 25, 2000 || Socorro || LINEAR || — || align=right | 1.9 km || 
|-id=506 bgcolor=#fefefe
| 61506 ||  || — || August 25, 2000 || Socorro || LINEAR || NYS || align=right | 2.4 km || 
|-id=507 bgcolor=#fefefe
| 61507 ||  || — || August 25, 2000 || Socorro || LINEAR || — || align=right | 2.9 km || 
|-id=508 bgcolor=#E9E9E9
| 61508 ||  || — || August 25, 2000 || Socorro || LINEAR || AGN || align=right | 3.3 km || 
|-id=509 bgcolor=#E9E9E9
| 61509 ||  || — || August 25, 2000 || Socorro || LINEAR || — || align=right | 4.4 km || 
|-id=510 bgcolor=#E9E9E9
| 61510 ||  || — || August 25, 2000 || Socorro || LINEAR || — || align=right | 2.2 km || 
|-id=511 bgcolor=#E9E9E9
| 61511 ||  || — || August 25, 2000 || Socorro || LINEAR || MAR || align=right | 3.3 km || 
|-id=512 bgcolor=#fefefe
| 61512 ||  || — || August 26, 2000 || Socorro || LINEAR || V || align=right | 1.1 km || 
|-id=513 bgcolor=#d6d6d6
| 61513 ||  || — || August 26, 2000 || Socorro || LINEAR || KOR || align=right | 2.8 km || 
|-id=514 bgcolor=#fefefe
| 61514 ||  || — || August 26, 2000 || Socorro || LINEAR || SUL || align=right | 4.9 km || 
|-id=515 bgcolor=#E9E9E9
| 61515 ||  || — || August 26, 2000 || Socorro || LINEAR || — || align=right | 2.3 km || 
|-id=516 bgcolor=#fefefe
| 61516 ||  || — || August 26, 2000 || Socorro || LINEAR || V || align=right | 1.7 km || 
|-id=517 bgcolor=#E9E9E9
| 61517 ||  || — || August 26, 2000 || Socorro || LINEAR || — || align=right | 2.8 km || 
|-id=518 bgcolor=#d6d6d6
| 61518 ||  || — || August 26, 2000 || Socorro || LINEAR || — || align=right | 4.1 km || 
|-id=519 bgcolor=#E9E9E9
| 61519 ||  || — || August 26, 2000 || Socorro || LINEAR || — || align=right | 4.6 km || 
|-id=520 bgcolor=#E9E9E9
| 61520 ||  || — || August 26, 2000 || Socorro || LINEAR || MAR || align=right | 2.5 km || 
|-id=521 bgcolor=#fefefe
| 61521 ||  || — || August 26, 2000 || Socorro || LINEAR || V || align=right | 2.3 km || 
|-id=522 bgcolor=#E9E9E9
| 61522 ||  || — || August 26, 2000 || Socorro || LINEAR || — || align=right | 2.7 km || 
|-id=523 bgcolor=#E9E9E9
| 61523 ||  || — || August 26, 2000 || Socorro || LINEAR || NEM || align=right | 5.1 km || 
|-id=524 bgcolor=#fefefe
| 61524 ||  || — || August 26, 2000 || Socorro || LINEAR || — || align=right | 2.1 km || 
|-id=525 bgcolor=#E9E9E9
| 61525 ||  || — || August 26, 2000 || Socorro || LINEAR || — || align=right | 6.8 km || 
|-id=526 bgcolor=#E9E9E9
| 61526 ||  || — || August 28, 2000 || Socorro || LINEAR || — || align=right | 6.1 km || 
|-id=527 bgcolor=#d6d6d6
| 61527 ||  || — || August 28, 2000 || Socorro || LINEAR || — || align=right | 4.1 km || 
|-id=528 bgcolor=#fefefe
| 61528 ||  || — || August 28, 2000 || Socorro || LINEAR || V || align=right | 1.6 km || 
|-id=529 bgcolor=#fefefe
| 61529 ||  || — || August 28, 2000 || Socorro || LINEAR || NYS || align=right | 1.9 km || 
|-id=530 bgcolor=#fefefe
| 61530 ||  || — || August 28, 2000 || Socorro || LINEAR || — || align=right | 1.9 km || 
|-id=531 bgcolor=#E9E9E9
| 61531 ||  || — || August 28, 2000 || Socorro || LINEAR || — || align=right | 5.6 km || 
|-id=532 bgcolor=#d6d6d6
| 61532 ||  || — || August 28, 2000 || Socorro || LINEAR || HYG || align=right | 6.7 km || 
|-id=533 bgcolor=#E9E9E9
| 61533 ||  || — || August 28, 2000 || Socorro || LINEAR || DOR || align=right | 9.0 km || 
|-id=534 bgcolor=#E9E9E9
| 61534 ||  || — || August 28, 2000 || Socorro || LINEAR || — || align=right | 4.9 km || 
|-id=535 bgcolor=#fefefe
| 61535 ||  || — || August 28, 2000 || Socorro || LINEAR || — || align=right | 2.1 km || 
|-id=536 bgcolor=#fefefe
| 61536 ||  || — || August 28, 2000 || Socorro || LINEAR || V || align=right | 2.9 km || 
|-id=537 bgcolor=#fefefe
| 61537 ||  || — || August 28, 2000 || Socorro || LINEAR || V || align=right | 1.6 km || 
|-id=538 bgcolor=#E9E9E9
| 61538 ||  || — || August 28, 2000 || Socorro || LINEAR || — || align=right | 5.7 km || 
|-id=539 bgcolor=#fefefe
| 61539 ||  || — || August 28, 2000 || Socorro || LINEAR || — || align=right | 2.2 km || 
|-id=540 bgcolor=#fefefe
| 61540 ||  || — || August 28, 2000 || Socorro || LINEAR || — || align=right | 1.9 km || 
|-id=541 bgcolor=#d6d6d6
| 61541 ||  || — || August 28, 2000 || Socorro || LINEAR || — || align=right | 9.8 km || 
|-id=542 bgcolor=#E9E9E9
| 61542 ||  || — || August 28, 2000 || Socorro || LINEAR || — || align=right | 2.9 km || 
|-id=543 bgcolor=#E9E9E9
| 61543 ||  || — || August 28, 2000 || Socorro || LINEAR || — || align=right | 6.7 km || 
|-id=544 bgcolor=#fefefe
| 61544 ||  || — || August 28, 2000 || Socorro || LINEAR || — || align=right | 5.0 km || 
|-id=545 bgcolor=#E9E9E9
| 61545 ||  || — || August 28, 2000 || Socorro || LINEAR || — || align=right | 2.4 km || 
|-id=546 bgcolor=#fefefe
| 61546 ||  || — || August 28, 2000 || Socorro || LINEAR || — || align=right | 3.2 km || 
|-id=547 bgcolor=#E9E9E9
| 61547 ||  || — || August 28, 2000 || Socorro || LINEAR || — || align=right | 2.4 km || 
|-id=548 bgcolor=#d6d6d6
| 61548 ||  || — || August 28, 2000 || Socorro || LINEAR || EOS || align=right | 6.1 km || 
|-id=549 bgcolor=#E9E9E9
| 61549 ||  || — || August 28, 2000 || Reedy Creek || J. Broughton || MAR || align=right | 4.3 km || 
|-id=550 bgcolor=#FA8072
| 61550 ||  || — || August 28, 2000 || Socorro || LINEAR || — || align=right | 2.2 km || 
|-id=551 bgcolor=#d6d6d6
| 61551 ||  || — || August 24, 2000 || Socorro || LINEAR || — || align=right | 7.3 km || 
|-id=552 bgcolor=#fefefe
| 61552 ||  || — || August 24, 2000 || Socorro || LINEAR || NYS || align=right | 1.9 km || 
|-id=553 bgcolor=#fefefe
| 61553 ||  || — || August 24, 2000 || Socorro || LINEAR || — || align=right | 2.5 km || 
|-id=554 bgcolor=#fefefe
| 61554 ||  || — || August 24, 2000 || Socorro || LINEAR || — || align=right | 1.5 km || 
|-id=555 bgcolor=#E9E9E9
| 61555 ||  || — || August 24, 2000 || Socorro || LINEAR || — || align=right | 4.5 km || 
|-id=556 bgcolor=#E9E9E9
| 61556 ||  || — || August 24, 2000 || Socorro || LINEAR || — || align=right | 2.9 km || 
|-id=557 bgcolor=#E9E9E9
| 61557 ||  || — || August 24, 2000 || Socorro || LINEAR || PAD || align=right | 4.1 km || 
|-id=558 bgcolor=#E9E9E9
| 61558 ||  || — || August 24, 2000 || Socorro || LINEAR || AGN || align=right | 2.6 km || 
|-id=559 bgcolor=#fefefe
| 61559 ||  || — || August 24, 2000 || Socorro || LINEAR || NYS || align=right data-sort-value="0.96" | 960 m || 
|-id=560 bgcolor=#fefefe
| 61560 ||  || — || August 24, 2000 || Socorro || LINEAR || NYS || align=right | 3.3 km || 
|-id=561 bgcolor=#fefefe
| 61561 ||  || — || August 24, 2000 || Socorro || LINEAR || — || align=right | 2.4 km || 
|-id=562 bgcolor=#fefefe
| 61562 ||  || — || August 24, 2000 || Socorro || LINEAR || — || align=right | 2.3 km || 
|-id=563 bgcolor=#d6d6d6
| 61563 ||  || — || August 24, 2000 || Socorro || LINEAR || — || align=right | 5.6 km || 
|-id=564 bgcolor=#fefefe
| 61564 ||  || — || August 24, 2000 || Socorro || LINEAR || — || align=right | 2.1 km || 
|-id=565 bgcolor=#E9E9E9
| 61565 ||  || — || August 24, 2000 || Socorro || LINEAR || — || align=right | 2.7 km || 
|-id=566 bgcolor=#d6d6d6
| 61566 ||  || — || August 24, 2000 || Socorro || LINEAR || — || align=right | 7.3 km || 
|-id=567 bgcolor=#d6d6d6
| 61567 ||  || — || August 24, 2000 || Socorro || LINEAR || HYG || align=right | 6.7 km || 
|-id=568 bgcolor=#fefefe
| 61568 ||  || — || August 24, 2000 || Socorro || LINEAR || — || align=right | 2.6 km || 
|-id=569 bgcolor=#fefefe
| 61569 ||  || — || August 24, 2000 || Socorro || LINEAR || — || align=right | 3.3 km || 
|-id=570 bgcolor=#E9E9E9
| 61570 ||  || — || August 24, 2000 || Socorro || LINEAR || — || align=right | 5.5 km || 
|-id=571 bgcolor=#d6d6d6
| 61571 ||  || — || August 24, 2000 || Socorro || LINEAR || KOR || align=right | 3.4 km || 
|-id=572 bgcolor=#E9E9E9
| 61572 ||  || — || August 24, 2000 || Socorro || LINEAR || — || align=right | 5.3 km || 
|-id=573 bgcolor=#fefefe
| 61573 ||  || — || August 24, 2000 || Socorro || LINEAR || NYS || align=right | 2.2 km || 
|-id=574 bgcolor=#fefefe
| 61574 ||  || — || August 24, 2000 || Socorro || LINEAR || — || align=right | 2.2 km || 
|-id=575 bgcolor=#E9E9E9
| 61575 ||  || — || August 24, 2000 || Socorro || LINEAR || — || align=right | 3.5 km || 
|-id=576 bgcolor=#d6d6d6
| 61576 ||  || — || August 24, 2000 || Socorro || LINEAR || HYG || align=right | 8.0 km || 
|-id=577 bgcolor=#d6d6d6
| 61577 ||  || — || August 24, 2000 || Socorro || LINEAR || — || align=right | 4.3 km || 
|-id=578 bgcolor=#E9E9E9
| 61578 ||  || — || August 24, 2000 || Socorro || LINEAR || — || align=right | 4.9 km || 
|-id=579 bgcolor=#E9E9E9
| 61579 ||  || — || August 24, 2000 || Socorro || LINEAR || — || align=right | 2.6 km || 
|-id=580 bgcolor=#d6d6d6
| 61580 ||  || — || August 24, 2000 || Socorro || LINEAR || — || align=right | 5.6 km || 
|-id=581 bgcolor=#fefefe
| 61581 ||  || — || August 24, 2000 || Socorro || LINEAR || — || align=right | 1.6 km || 
|-id=582 bgcolor=#d6d6d6
| 61582 ||  || — || August 24, 2000 || Socorro || LINEAR || HYG || align=right | 9.2 km || 
|-id=583 bgcolor=#fefefe
| 61583 ||  || — || August 24, 2000 || Socorro || LINEAR || — || align=right | 2.1 km || 
|-id=584 bgcolor=#E9E9E9
| 61584 ||  || — || August 24, 2000 || Socorro || LINEAR || — || align=right | 6.8 km || 
|-id=585 bgcolor=#E9E9E9
| 61585 ||  || — || August 24, 2000 || Socorro || LINEAR || — || align=right | 1.9 km || 
|-id=586 bgcolor=#fefefe
| 61586 ||  || — || August 24, 2000 || Socorro || LINEAR || NYS || align=right | 2.2 km || 
|-id=587 bgcolor=#E9E9E9
| 61587 ||  || — || August 24, 2000 || Socorro || LINEAR || — || align=right | 4.7 km || 
|-id=588 bgcolor=#fefefe
| 61588 ||  || — || August 25, 2000 || Socorro || LINEAR || V || align=right | 1.5 km || 
|-id=589 bgcolor=#E9E9E9
| 61589 ||  || — || August 25, 2000 || Socorro || LINEAR || — || align=right | 4.8 km || 
|-id=590 bgcolor=#E9E9E9
| 61590 ||  || — || August 25, 2000 || Socorro || LINEAR || NEM || align=right | 6.5 km || 
|-id=591 bgcolor=#d6d6d6
| 61591 ||  || — || August 25, 2000 || Socorro || LINEAR || EOS || align=right | 4.4 km || 
|-id=592 bgcolor=#fefefe
| 61592 ||  || — || August 25, 2000 || Socorro || LINEAR || — || align=right | 1.7 km || 
|-id=593 bgcolor=#E9E9E9
| 61593 ||  || — || August 25, 2000 || Socorro || LINEAR || — || align=right | 4.6 km || 
|-id=594 bgcolor=#E9E9E9
| 61594 ||  || — || August 25, 2000 || Socorro || LINEAR || — || align=right | 3.1 km || 
|-id=595 bgcolor=#d6d6d6
| 61595 ||  || — || August 25, 2000 || Socorro || LINEAR || HYG || align=right | 8.6 km || 
|-id=596 bgcolor=#fefefe
| 61596 ||  || — || August 25, 2000 || Socorro || LINEAR || FLO || align=right | 2.0 km || 
|-id=597 bgcolor=#fefefe
| 61597 ||  || — || August 25, 2000 || Socorro || LINEAR || — || align=right | 1.6 km || 
|-id=598 bgcolor=#E9E9E9
| 61598 ||  || — || August 25, 2000 || Socorro || LINEAR || — || align=right | 2.6 km || 
|-id=599 bgcolor=#E9E9E9
| 61599 ||  || — || August 25, 2000 || Socorro || LINEAR || — || align=right | 2.7 km || 
|-id=600 bgcolor=#fefefe
| 61600 ||  || — || August 25, 2000 || Socorro || LINEAR || FLO || align=right | 1.8 km || 
|}

61601–61700 

|-bgcolor=#E9E9E9
| 61601 ||  || — || August 25, 2000 || Socorro || LINEAR || — || align=right | 4.4 km || 
|-id=602 bgcolor=#d6d6d6
| 61602 ||  || — || August 25, 2000 || Socorro || LINEAR || EOS || align=right | 6.6 km || 
|-id=603 bgcolor=#E9E9E9
| 61603 ||  || — || August 25, 2000 || Socorro || LINEAR || — || align=right | 5.4 km || 
|-id=604 bgcolor=#E9E9E9
| 61604 ||  || — || August 25, 2000 || Socorro || LINEAR || GEF || align=right | 3.5 km || 
|-id=605 bgcolor=#E9E9E9
| 61605 ||  || — || August 25, 2000 || Socorro || LINEAR || HOF || align=right | 6.6 km || 
|-id=606 bgcolor=#E9E9E9
| 61606 ||  || — || August 25, 2000 || Socorro || LINEAR || — || align=right | 2.6 km || 
|-id=607 bgcolor=#E9E9E9
| 61607 ||  || — || August 25, 2000 || Socorro || LINEAR || EUN || align=right | 3.2 km || 
|-id=608 bgcolor=#E9E9E9
| 61608 ||  || — || August 26, 2000 || Socorro || LINEAR || — || align=right | 4.9 km || 
|-id=609 bgcolor=#fefefe
| 61609 ||  || — || August 26, 2000 || Socorro || LINEAR || NYS || align=right | 3.6 km || 
|-id=610 bgcolor=#C2FFFF
| 61610 ||  || — || August 26, 2000 || Socorro || LINEAR || L5 || align=right | 16 km || 
|-id=611 bgcolor=#E9E9E9
| 61611 ||  || — || August 28, 2000 || Socorro || LINEAR || — || align=right | 4.9 km || 
|-id=612 bgcolor=#E9E9E9
| 61612 ||  || — || August 28, 2000 || Socorro || LINEAR || NEM || align=right | 5.4 km || 
|-id=613 bgcolor=#E9E9E9
| 61613 ||  || — || August 28, 2000 || Socorro || LINEAR || HEN || align=right | 3.8 km || 
|-id=614 bgcolor=#d6d6d6
| 61614 ||  || — || August 28, 2000 || Socorro || LINEAR || — || align=right | 6.7 km || 
|-id=615 bgcolor=#fefefe
| 61615 ||  || — || August 28, 2000 || Socorro || LINEAR || — || align=right | 1.8 km || 
|-id=616 bgcolor=#d6d6d6
| 61616 ||  || — || August 28, 2000 || Socorro || LINEAR || HYG || align=right | 7.3 km || 
|-id=617 bgcolor=#fefefe
| 61617 ||  || — || August 28, 2000 || Socorro || LINEAR || NYS || align=right | 2.0 km || 
|-id=618 bgcolor=#E9E9E9
| 61618 ||  || — || August 28, 2000 || Socorro || LINEAR || — || align=right | 5.4 km || 
|-id=619 bgcolor=#d6d6d6
| 61619 ||  || — || August 28, 2000 || Socorro || LINEAR || — || align=right | 7.3 km || 
|-id=620 bgcolor=#E9E9E9
| 61620 ||  || — || August 28, 2000 || Socorro || LINEAR || — || align=right | 4.8 km || 
|-id=621 bgcolor=#E9E9E9
| 61621 ||  || — || August 28, 2000 || Socorro || LINEAR || — || align=right | 2.1 km || 
|-id=622 bgcolor=#d6d6d6
| 61622 ||  || — || August 28, 2000 || Socorro || LINEAR || — || align=right | 4.7 km || 
|-id=623 bgcolor=#fefefe
| 61623 ||  || — || August 28, 2000 || Socorro || LINEAR || — || align=right | 4.3 km || 
|-id=624 bgcolor=#E9E9E9
| 61624 ||  || — || August 28, 2000 || Socorro || LINEAR || — || align=right | 4.3 km || 
|-id=625 bgcolor=#E9E9E9
| 61625 ||  || — || August 28, 2000 || Socorro || LINEAR || — || align=right | 6.9 km || 
|-id=626 bgcolor=#E9E9E9
| 61626 ||  || — || August 28, 2000 || Socorro || LINEAR || EUN || align=right | 2.9 km || 
|-id=627 bgcolor=#d6d6d6
| 61627 ||  || — || August 28, 2000 || Socorro || LINEAR || EOS || align=right | 5.4 km || 
|-id=628 bgcolor=#fefefe
| 61628 ||  || — || August 28, 2000 || Socorro || LINEAR || — || align=right | 3.1 km || 
|-id=629 bgcolor=#fefefe
| 61629 ||  || — || August 28, 2000 || Socorro || LINEAR || V || align=right | 1.6 km || 
|-id=630 bgcolor=#E9E9E9
| 61630 ||  || — || August 28, 2000 || Socorro || LINEAR || — || align=right | 2.8 km || 
|-id=631 bgcolor=#E9E9E9
| 61631 ||  || — || August 28, 2000 || Socorro || LINEAR || — || align=right | 5.7 km || 
|-id=632 bgcolor=#E9E9E9
| 61632 ||  || — || August 28, 2000 || Socorro || LINEAR || — || align=right | 6.2 km || 
|-id=633 bgcolor=#fefefe
| 61633 ||  || — || August 28, 2000 || Socorro || LINEAR || V || align=right | 1.7 km || 
|-id=634 bgcolor=#d6d6d6
| 61634 ||  || — || August 28, 2000 || Socorro || LINEAR || HYG || align=right | 7.0 km || 
|-id=635 bgcolor=#fefefe
| 61635 ||  || — || August 28, 2000 || Socorro || LINEAR || — || align=right | 2.5 km || 
|-id=636 bgcolor=#fefefe
| 61636 ||  || — || August 28, 2000 || Socorro || LINEAR || — || align=right | 2.2 km || 
|-id=637 bgcolor=#E9E9E9
| 61637 ||  || — || August 28, 2000 || Socorro || LINEAR || — || align=right | 3.3 km || 
|-id=638 bgcolor=#fefefe
| 61638 ||  || — || August 28, 2000 || Socorro || LINEAR || V || align=right | 1.8 km || 
|-id=639 bgcolor=#E9E9E9
| 61639 ||  || — || August 28, 2000 || Socorro || LINEAR || — || align=right | 3.2 km || 
|-id=640 bgcolor=#E9E9E9
| 61640 ||  || — || August 28, 2000 || Socorro || LINEAR || JUN || align=right | 9.6 km || 
|-id=641 bgcolor=#fefefe
| 61641 ||  || — || August 29, 2000 || Socorro || LINEAR || V || align=right | 1.8 km || 
|-id=642 bgcolor=#d6d6d6
| 61642 ||  || — || August 29, 2000 || Socorro || LINEAR || HYG || align=right | 7.8 km || 
|-id=643 bgcolor=#fefefe
| 61643 ||  || — || August 29, 2000 || Socorro || LINEAR || — || align=right | 1.8 km || 
|-id=644 bgcolor=#E9E9E9
| 61644 ||  || — || August 29, 2000 || Socorro || LINEAR || EUN || align=right | 3.2 km || 
|-id=645 bgcolor=#E9E9E9
| 61645 ||  || — || August 27, 2000 || Ondřejov || P. Kušnirák, P. Pravec || — || align=right | 3.2 km || 
|-id=646 bgcolor=#fefefe
| 61646 ||  || — || August 24, 2000 || Socorro || LINEAR || — || align=right | 1.6 km || 
|-id=647 bgcolor=#E9E9E9
| 61647 ||  || — || August 24, 2000 || Socorro || LINEAR || NEM || align=right | 5.7 km || 
|-id=648 bgcolor=#fefefe
| 61648 ||  || — || August 24, 2000 || Socorro || LINEAR || — || align=right | 4.4 km || 
|-id=649 bgcolor=#d6d6d6
| 61649 ||  || — || August 24, 2000 || Socorro || LINEAR || 628 || align=right | 4.4 km || 
|-id=650 bgcolor=#fefefe
| 61650 ||  || — || August 24, 2000 || Socorro || LINEAR || — || align=right | 4.3 km || 
|-id=651 bgcolor=#d6d6d6
| 61651 ||  || — || August 24, 2000 || Socorro || LINEAR || — || align=right | 8.2 km || 
|-id=652 bgcolor=#E9E9E9
| 61652 ||  || — || August 24, 2000 || Socorro || LINEAR || — || align=right | 3.0 km || 
|-id=653 bgcolor=#E9E9E9
| 61653 ||  || — || August 24, 2000 || Socorro || LINEAR || — || align=right | 4.3 km || 
|-id=654 bgcolor=#d6d6d6
| 61654 ||  || — || August 24, 2000 || Socorro || LINEAR || TEL || align=right | 3.3 km || 
|-id=655 bgcolor=#d6d6d6
| 61655 ||  || — || August 24, 2000 || Socorro || LINEAR || — || align=right | 3.4 km || 
|-id=656 bgcolor=#E9E9E9
| 61656 ||  || — || August 24, 2000 || Socorro || LINEAR || — || align=right | 3.4 km || 
|-id=657 bgcolor=#d6d6d6
| 61657 ||  || — || August 24, 2000 || Socorro || LINEAR || KOR || align=right | 3.0 km || 
|-id=658 bgcolor=#fefefe
| 61658 ||  || — || August 24, 2000 || Socorro || LINEAR || NYS || align=right | 3.7 km || 
|-id=659 bgcolor=#fefefe
| 61659 ||  || — || August 24, 2000 || Socorro || LINEAR || — || align=right | 1.8 km || 
|-id=660 bgcolor=#d6d6d6
| 61660 ||  || — || August 24, 2000 || Socorro || LINEAR || EOS || align=right | 5.0 km || 
|-id=661 bgcolor=#fefefe
| 61661 ||  || — || August 24, 2000 || Socorro || LINEAR || FLO || align=right | 2.7 km || 
|-id=662 bgcolor=#E9E9E9
| 61662 ||  || — || August 25, 2000 || Socorro || LINEAR || — || align=right | 2.8 km || 
|-id=663 bgcolor=#fefefe
| 61663 ||  || — || August 26, 2000 || Socorro || LINEAR || — || align=right | 2.7 km || 
|-id=664 bgcolor=#E9E9E9
| 61664 ||  || — || August 28, 2000 || Socorro || LINEAR || WIT || align=right | 2.8 km || 
|-id=665 bgcolor=#fefefe
| 61665 ||  || — || August 29, 2000 || Socorro || LINEAR || FLO || align=right | 2.0 km || 
|-id=666 bgcolor=#d6d6d6
| 61666 ||  || — || August 30, 2000 || Farra d'Isonzo || Farra d'Isonzo || EOS || align=right | 6.2 km || 
|-id=667 bgcolor=#E9E9E9
| 61667 ||  || — || August 25, 2000 || Socorro || LINEAR || — || align=right | 3.5 km || 
|-id=668 bgcolor=#d6d6d6
| 61668 ||  || — || August 25, 2000 || Socorro || LINEAR || — || align=right | 7.5 km || 
|-id=669 bgcolor=#d6d6d6
| 61669 ||  || — || August 25, 2000 || Socorro || LINEAR || — || align=right | 6.8 km || 
|-id=670 bgcolor=#E9E9E9
| 61670 ||  || — || August 25, 2000 || Socorro || LINEAR || — || align=right | 3.4 km || 
|-id=671 bgcolor=#E9E9E9
| 61671 ||  || — || August 25, 2000 || Socorro || LINEAR || — || align=right | 2.3 km || 
|-id=672 bgcolor=#d6d6d6
| 61672 ||  || — || August 25, 2000 || Socorro || LINEAR || — || align=right | 8.1 km || 
|-id=673 bgcolor=#E9E9E9
| 61673 ||  || — || August 25, 2000 || Socorro || LINEAR || — || align=right | 2.6 km || 
|-id=674 bgcolor=#d6d6d6
| 61674 ||  || — || August 25, 2000 || Socorro || LINEAR || — || align=right | 8.2 km || 
|-id=675 bgcolor=#fefefe
| 61675 ||  || — || August 25, 2000 || Socorro || LINEAR || — || align=right | 2.4 km || 
|-id=676 bgcolor=#E9E9E9
| 61676 ||  || — || August 25, 2000 || Socorro || LINEAR || HNS || align=right | 4.7 km || 
|-id=677 bgcolor=#d6d6d6
| 61677 ||  || — || August 26, 2000 || Socorro || LINEAR || EOS || align=right | 3.8 km || 
|-id=678 bgcolor=#d6d6d6
| 61678 ||  || — || August 26, 2000 || Socorro || LINEAR || EOS || align=right | 5.3 km || 
|-id=679 bgcolor=#d6d6d6
| 61679 ||  || — || August 26, 2000 || Socorro || LINEAR || — || align=right | 6.0 km || 
|-id=680 bgcolor=#E9E9E9
| 61680 ||  || — || August 26, 2000 || Socorro || LINEAR || — || align=right | 2.3 km || 
|-id=681 bgcolor=#d6d6d6
| 61681 ||  || — || August 29, 2000 || Socorro || LINEAR || KOR || align=right | 3.3 km || 
|-id=682 bgcolor=#fefefe
| 61682 ||  || — || August 29, 2000 || Socorro || LINEAR || V || align=right | 2.8 km || 
|-id=683 bgcolor=#E9E9E9
| 61683 ||  || — || August 31, 2000 || Socorro || LINEAR || — || align=right | 2.4 km || 
|-id=684 bgcolor=#E9E9E9
| 61684 ||  || — || August 31, 2000 || Socorro || LINEAR || — || align=right | 7.1 km || 
|-id=685 bgcolor=#fefefe
| 61685 ||  || — || August 31, 2000 || Socorro || LINEAR || NYS || align=right | 1.7 km || 
|-id=686 bgcolor=#d6d6d6
| 61686 ||  || — || August 31, 2000 || Socorro || LINEAR || — || align=right | 3.8 km || 
|-id=687 bgcolor=#d6d6d6
| 61687 ||  || — || August 31, 2000 || Socorro || LINEAR || ALA || align=right | 8.5 km || 
|-id=688 bgcolor=#fefefe
| 61688 ||  || — || August 24, 2000 || Socorro || LINEAR || V || align=right | 2.3 km || 
|-id=689 bgcolor=#E9E9E9
| 61689 ||  || — || August 24, 2000 || Socorro || LINEAR || — || align=right | 3.8 km || 
|-id=690 bgcolor=#E9E9E9
| 61690 ||  || — || August 24, 2000 || Socorro || LINEAR || — || align=right | 4.7 km || 
|-id=691 bgcolor=#E9E9E9
| 61691 ||  || — || August 25, 2000 || Socorro || LINEAR || — || align=right | 7.4 km || 
|-id=692 bgcolor=#E9E9E9
| 61692 ||  || — || August 31, 2000 || Socorro || LINEAR || — || align=right | 2.7 km || 
|-id=693 bgcolor=#E9E9E9
| 61693 ||  || — || August 24, 2000 || Socorro || LINEAR || — || align=right | 6.5 km || 
|-id=694 bgcolor=#d6d6d6
| 61694 ||  || — || August 31, 2000 || Socorro || LINEAR || KOR || align=right | 3.5 km || 
|-id=695 bgcolor=#fefefe
| 61695 ||  || — || August 26, 2000 || Socorro || LINEAR || FLO || align=right | 1.2 km || 
|-id=696 bgcolor=#fefefe
| 61696 ||  || — || August 26, 2000 || Socorro || LINEAR || NYS || align=right | 4.2 km || 
|-id=697 bgcolor=#fefefe
| 61697 ||  || — || August 26, 2000 || Socorro || LINEAR || — || align=right | 2.9 km || 
|-id=698 bgcolor=#fefefe
| 61698 ||  || — || August 26, 2000 || Socorro || LINEAR || — || align=right | 3.9 km || 
|-id=699 bgcolor=#fefefe
| 61699 ||  || — || August 26, 2000 || Socorro || LINEAR || MAS || align=right | 1.4 km || 
|-id=700 bgcolor=#d6d6d6
| 61700 ||  || — || August 26, 2000 || Socorro || LINEAR || — || align=right | 8.6 km || 
|}

61701–61800 

|-bgcolor=#E9E9E9
| 61701 ||  || — || August 26, 2000 || Socorro || LINEAR || — || align=right | 2.8 km || 
|-id=702 bgcolor=#fefefe
| 61702 ||  || — || August 26, 2000 || Socorro || LINEAR || — || align=right | 2.4 km || 
|-id=703 bgcolor=#fefefe
| 61703 ||  || — || August 26, 2000 || Socorro || LINEAR || NYS || align=right | 1.8 km || 
|-id=704 bgcolor=#E9E9E9
| 61704 ||  || — || August 26, 2000 || Socorro || LINEAR || — || align=right | 2.9 km || 
|-id=705 bgcolor=#fefefe
| 61705 ||  || — || August 26, 2000 || Socorro || LINEAR || — || align=right | 2.3 km || 
|-id=706 bgcolor=#fefefe
| 61706 ||  || — || August 28, 2000 || Socorro || LINEAR || — || align=right | 2.1 km || 
|-id=707 bgcolor=#fefefe
| 61707 ||  || — || August 31, 2000 || Socorro || LINEAR || V || align=right | 1.2 km || 
|-id=708 bgcolor=#d6d6d6
| 61708 ||  || — || August 31, 2000 || Socorro || LINEAR || — || align=right | 5.9 km || 
|-id=709 bgcolor=#fefefe
| 61709 ||  || — || August 31, 2000 || Socorro || LINEAR || — || align=right | 1.8 km || 
|-id=710 bgcolor=#E9E9E9
| 61710 ||  || — || August 31, 2000 || Socorro || LINEAR || — || align=right | 6.7 km || 
|-id=711 bgcolor=#E9E9E9
| 61711 ||  || — || August 31, 2000 || Socorro || LINEAR || — || align=right | 2.4 km || 
|-id=712 bgcolor=#E9E9E9
| 61712 ||  || — || August 31, 2000 || Socorro || LINEAR || — || align=right | 5.7 km || 
|-id=713 bgcolor=#fefefe
| 61713 ||  || — || August 31, 2000 || Socorro || LINEAR || NYS || align=right | 2.2 km || 
|-id=714 bgcolor=#fefefe
| 61714 ||  || — || August 31, 2000 || Socorro || LINEAR || MAS || align=right | 2.0 km || 
|-id=715 bgcolor=#E9E9E9
| 61715 ||  || — || August 31, 2000 || Socorro || LINEAR || — || align=right | 2.7 km || 
|-id=716 bgcolor=#d6d6d6
| 61716 ||  || — || August 31, 2000 || Socorro || LINEAR || EOS || align=right | 5.6 km || 
|-id=717 bgcolor=#E9E9E9
| 61717 ||  || — || August 31, 2000 || Socorro || LINEAR || — || align=right | 2.5 km || 
|-id=718 bgcolor=#E9E9E9
| 61718 ||  || — || August 31, 2000 || Socorro || LINEAR || HOF || align=right | 8.4 km || 
|-id=719 bgcolor=#fefefe
| 61719 ||  || — || August 31, 2000 || Socorro || LINEAR || — || align=right | 3.2 km || 
|-id=720 bgcolor=#E9E9E9
| 61720 ||  || — || August 31, 2000 || Socorro || LINEAR || — || align=right | 3.1 km || 
|-id=721 bgcolor=#E9E9E9
| 61721 ||  || — || August 31, 2000 || Socorro || LINEAR || — || align=right | 5.1 km || 
|-id=722 bgcolor=#d6d6d6
| 61722 ||  || — || August 31, 2000 || Socorro || LINEAR || — || align=right | 8.0 km || 
|-id=723 bgcolor=#E9E9E9
| 61723 ||  || — || August 31, 2000 || Socorro || LINEAR || — || align=right | 2.6 km || 
|-id=724 bgcolor=#fefefe
| 61724 ||  || — || August 31, 2000 || Socorro || LINEAR || NYS || align=right | 2.0 km || 
|-id=725 bgcolor=#E9E9E9
| 61725 ||  || — || August 31, 2000 || Socorro || LINEAR || GEF || align=right | 4.1 km || 
|-id=726 bgcolor=#d6d6d6
| 61726 ||  || — || August 31, 2000 || Socorro || LINEAR || — || align=right | 6.3 km || 
|-id=727 bgcolor=#d6d6d6
| 61727 ||  || — || August 31, 2000 || Socorro || LINEAR || TEL || align=right | 3.1 km || 
|-id=728 bgcolor=#E9E9E9
| 61728 ||  || — || August 31, 2000 || Socorro || LINEAR || GAL || align=right | 3.7 km || 
|-id=729 bgcolor=#E9E9E9
| 61729 ||  || — || August 31, 2000 || Socorro || LINEAR || HNS || align=right | 2.7 km || 
|-id=730 bgcolor=#fefefe
| 61730 ||  || — || August 27, 2000 || Kvistaberg || UDAS || — || align=right | 2.1 km || 
|-id=731 bgcolor=#E9E9E9
| 61731 ||  || — || August 29, 2000 || Siding Spring || R. H. McNaught || — || align=right | 6.9 km || 
|-id=732 bgcolor=#d6d6d6
| 61732 ||  || — || August 25, 2000 || Socorro || LINEAR || EOS || align=right | 4.0 km || 
|-id=733 bgcolor=#E9E9E9
| 61733 ||  || — || August 25, 2000 || Socorro || LINEAR || EUN || align=right | 4.7 km || 
|-id=734 bgcolor=#fefefe
| 61734 ||  || — || August 25, 2000 || Socorro || LINEAR || V || align=right | 1.9 km || 
|-id=735 bgcolor=#fefefe
| 61735 ||  || — || August 26, 2000 || Socorro || LINEAR || — || align=right | 1.5 km || 
|-id=736 bgcolor=#fefefe
| 61736 ||  || — || August 29, 2000 || Socorro || LINEAR || — || align=right | 3.1 km || 
|-id=737 bgcolor=#d6d6d6
| 61737 ||  || — || August 29, 2000 || Socorro || LINEAR || EOS || align=right | 4.3 km || 
|-id=738 bgcolor=#fefefe
| 61738 ||  || — || August 29, 2000 || Socorro || LINEAR || FLO || align=right | 1.2 km || 
|-id=739 bgcolor=#fefefe
| 61739 ||  || — || August 29, 2000 || Socorro || LINEAR || — || align=right | 2.2 km || 
|-id=740 bgcolor=#E9E9E9
| 61740 ||  || — || August 29, 2000 || Socorro || LINEAR || PAD || align=right | 4.2 km || 
|-id=741 bgcolor=#fefefe
| 61741 ||  || — || August 29, 2000 || Socorro || LINEAR || V || align=right | 1.7 km || 
|-id=742 bgcolor=#fefefe
| 61742 ||  || — || August 29, 2000 || Socorro || LINEAR || — || align=right | 3.3 km || 
|-id=743 bgcolor=#E9E9E9
| 61743 ||  || — || August 29, 2000 || Socorro || LINEAR || WIT || align=right | 2.4 km || 
|-id=744 bgcolor=#d6d6d6
| 61744 ||  || — || August 31, 2000 || Socorro || LINEAR || — || align=right | 4.4 km || 
|-id=745 bgcolor=#E9E9E9
| 61745 ||  || — || August 31, 2000 || Socorro || LINEAR || — || align=right | 3.4 km || 
|-id=746 bgcolor=#E9E9E9
| 61746 ||  || — || August 31, 2000 || Socorro || LINEAR || — || align=right | 4.2 km || 
|-id=747 bgcolor=#d6d6d6
| 61747 ||  || — || August 31, 2000 || Socorro || LINEAR || — || align=right | 6.6 km || 
|-id=748 bgcolor=#E9E9E9
| 61748 ||  || — || August 31, 2000 || Socorro || LINEAR || GEF || align=right | 3.3 km || 
|-id=749 bgcolor=#E9E9E9
| 61749 ||  || — || August 31, 2000 || Socorro || LINEAR || — || align=right | 3.9 km || 
|-id=750 bgcolor=#E9E9E9
| 61750 ||  || — || August 31, 2000 || Socorro || LINEAR || slow || align=right | 3.0 km || 
|-id=751 bgcolor=#E9E9E9
| 61751 ||  || — || August 31, 2000 || Socorro || LINEAR || — || align=right | 2.6 km || 
|-id=752 bgcolor=#fefefe
| 61752 ||  || — || August 31, 2000 || Socorro || LINEAR || — || align=right | 1.8 km || 
|-id=753 bgcolor=#d6d6d6
| 61753 ||  || — || August 31, 2000 || Socorro || LINEAR || URS || align=right | 6.7 km || 
|-id=754 bgcolor=#E9E9E9
| 61754 ||  || — || August 31, 2000 || Socorro || LINEAR || — || align=right | 4.5 km || 
|-id=755 bgcolor=#E9E9E9
| 61755 ||  || — || August 31, 2000 || Socorro || LINEAR || — || align=right | 3.3 km || 
|-id=756 bgcolor=#fefefe
| 61756 ||  || — || August 31, 2000 || Socorro || LINEAR || — || align=right | 1.7 km || 
|-id=757 bgcolor=#fefefe
| 61757 ||  || — || August 31, 2000 || Socorro || LINEAR || V || align=right | 1.8 km || 
|-id=758 bgcolor=#E9E9E9
| 61758 ||  || — || August 31, 2000 || Socorro || LINEAR || — || align=right | 3.8 km || 
|-id=759 bgcolor=#E9E9E9
| 61759 ||  || — || August 31, 2000 || Socorro || LINEAR || — || align=right | 4.7 km || 
|-id=760 bgcolor=#E9E9E9
| 61760 ||  || — || August 31, 2000 || Socorro || LINEAR || — || align=right | 6.4 km || 
|-id=761 bgcolor=#E9E9E9
| 61761 ||  || — || August 31, 2000 || Socorro || LINEAR || — || align=right | 4.3 km || 
|-id=762 bgcolor=#E9E9E9
| 61762 ||  || — || August 31, 2000 || Socorro || LINEAR || — || align=right | 4.6 km || 
|-id=763 bgcolor=#d6d6d6
| 61763 ||  || — || August 31, 2000 || Socorro || LINEAR || — || align=right | 5.3 km || 
|-id=764 bgcolor=#E9E9E9
| 61764 ||  || — || August 31, 2000 || Socorro || LINEAR || PAD || align=right | 4.4 km || 
|-id=765 bgcolor=#E9E9E9
| 61765 ||  || — || August 31, 2000 || Socorro || LINEAR || — || align=right | 3.5 km || 
|-id=766 bgcolor=#E9E9E9
| 61766 ||  || — || August 31, 2000 || Socorro || LINEAR || — || align=right | 2.5 km || 
|-id=767 bgcolor=#E9E9E9
| 61767 ||  || — || August 31, 2000 || Socorro || LINEAR || — || align=right | 6.2 km || 
|-id=768 bgcolor=#E9E9E9
| 61768 ||  || — || August 31, 2000 || Socorro || LINEAR || — || align=right | 2.8 km || 
|-id=769 bgcolor=#d6d6d6
| 61769 ||  || — || August 31, 2000 || Socorro || LINEAR || — || align=right | 7.2 km || 
|-id=770 bgcolor=#d6d6d6
| 61770 ||  || — || August 31, 2000 || Socorro || LINEAR || — || align=right | 4.4 km || 
|-id=771 bgcolor=#fefefe
| 61771 ||  || — || August 31, 2000 || Socorro || LINEAR || NYS || align=right | 1.5 km || 
|-id=772 bgcolor=#fefefe
| 61772 ||  || — || August 31, 2000 || Socorro || LINEAR || SUL || align=right | 4.1 km || 
|-id=773 bgcolor=#d6d6d6
| 61773 ||  || — || August 31, 2000 || Socorro || LINEAR || — || align=right | 5.3 km || 
|-id=774 bgcolor=#d6d6d6
| 61774 ||  || — || August 31, 2000 || Socorro || LINEAR || — || align=right | 8.7 km || 
|-id=775 bgcolor=#E9E9E9
| 61775 ||  || — || August 31, 2000 || Socorro || LINEAR || — || align=right | 2.4 km || 
|-id=776 bgcolor=#E9E9E9
| 61776 ||  || — || August 31, 2000 || Socorro || LINEAR || — || align=right | 2.8 km || 
|-id=777 bgcolor=#E9E9E9
| 61777 ||  || — || August 31, 2000 || Socorro || LINEAR || — || align=right | 2.6 km || 
|-id=778 bgcolor=#fefefe
| 61778 ||  || — || August 31, 2000 || Socorro || LINEAR || FLO || align=right | 2.4 km || 
|-id=779 bgcolor=#d6d6d6
| 61779 ||  || — || August 31, 2000 || Socorro || LINEAR || — || align=right | 4.1 km || 
|-id=780 bgcolor=#E9E9E9
| 61780 ||  || — || August 31, 2000 || Socorro || LINEAR || — || align=right | 2.3 km || 
|-id=781 bgcolor=#E9E9E9
| 61781 ||  || — || August 31, 2000 || Socorro || LINEAR || GEF || align=right | 3.2 km || 
|-id=782 bgcolor=#E9E9E9
| 61782 ||  || — || August 31, 2000 || Socorro || LINEAR || — || align=right | 3.1 km || 
|-id=783 bgcolor=#fefefe
| 61783 ||  || — || August 31, 2000 || Socorro || LINEAR || V || align=right | 1.6 km || 
|-id=784 bgcolor=#E9E9E9
| 61784 ||  || — || August 31, 2000 || Socorro || LINEAR || — || align=right | 5.2 km || 
|-id=785 bgcolor=#d6d6d6
| 61785 ||  || — || August 31, 2000 || Socorro || LINEAR || — || align=right | 7.1 km || 
|-id=786 bgcolor=#E9E9E9
| 61786 ||  || — || August 31, 2000 || Socorro || LINEAR || — || align=right | 6.4 km || 
|-id=787 bgcolor=#d6d6d6
| 61787 ||  || — || August 31, 2000 || Socorro || LINEAR || — || align=right | 6.0 km || 
|-id=788 bgcolor=#fefefe
| 61788 ||  || — || August 31, 2000 || Socorro || LINEAR || — || align=right | 6.2 km || 
|-id=789 bgcolor=#d6d6d6
| 61789 ||  || — || August 31, 2000 || Socorro || LINEAR || HYG || align=right | 8.0 km || 
|-id=790 bgcolor=#E9E9E9
| 61790 ||  || — || August 31, 2000 || Socorro || LINEAR || — || align=right | 2.8 km || 
|-id=791 bgcolor=#E9E9E9
| 61791 ||  || — || August 31, 2000 || Socorro || LINEAR || — || align=right | 3.7 km || 
|-id=792 bgcolor=#E9E9E9
| 61792 ||  || — || August 31, 2000 || Socorro || LINEAR || HOF || align=right | 5.9 km || 
|-id=793 bgcolor=#d6d6d6
| 61793 ||  || — || August 31, 2000 || Socorro || LINEAR || EOS || align=right | 4.0 km || 
|-id=794 bgcolor=#fefefe
| 61794 ||  || — || August 24, 2000 || Socorro || LINEAR || — || align=right | 2.4 km || 
|-id=795 bgcolor=#E9E9E9
| 61795 ||  || — || August 24, 2000 || Socorro || LINEAR || — || align=right | 3.3 km || 
|-id=796 bgcolor=#d6d6d6
| 61796 ||  || — || August 24, 2000 || Socorro || LINEAR || — || align=right | 3.8 km || 
|-id=797 bgcolor=#fefefe
| 61797 ||  || — || August 25, 2000 || Socorro || LINEAR || — || align=right | 2.2 km || 
|-id=798 bgcolor=#E9E9E9
| 61798 ||  || — || August 26, 2000 || Socorro || LINEAR || — || align=right | 4.6 km || 
|-id=799 bgcolor=#FA8072
| 61799 ||  || — || August 26, 2000 || Socorro || LINEAR || — || align=right | 2.4 km || 
|-id=800 bgcolor=#E9E9E9
| 61800 ||  || — || August 26, 2000 || Socorro || LINEAR || EUN || align=right | 3.3 km || 
|}

61801–61900 

|-bgcolor=#fefefe
| 61801 ||  || — || August 26, 2000 || Socorro || LINEAR || — || align=right | 2.5 km || 
|-id=802 bgcolor=#d6d6d6
| 61802 ||  || — || August 26, 2000 || Socorro || LINEAR || TEL || align=right | 3.1 km || 
|-id=803 bgcolor=#fefefe
| 61803 ||  || — || August 26, 2000 || Socorro || LINEAR || — || align=right | 2.5 km || 
|-id=804 bgcolor=#fefefe
| 61804 ||  || — || August 26, 2000 || Socorro || LINEAR || V || align=right | 2.0 km || 
|-id=805 bgcolor=#fefefe
| 61805 ||  || — || August 26, 2000 || Socorro || LINEAR || SUL || align=right | 4.0 km || 
|-id=806 bgcolor=#E9E9E9
| 61806 ||  || — || August 26, 2000 || Socorro || LINEAR || — || align=right | 2.2 km || 
|-id=807 bgcolor=#E9E9E9
| 61807 ||  || — || August 26, 2000 || Socorro || LINEAR || — || align=right | 2.5 km || 
|-id=808 bgcolor=#fefefe
| 61808 ||  || — || August 26, 2000 || Socorro || LINEAR || — || align=right | 1.8 km || 
|-id=809 bgcolor=#fefefe
| 61809 ||  || — || August 26, 2000 || Socorro || LINEAR || V || align=right | 1.9 km || 
|-id=810 bgcolor=#fefefe
| 61810 ||  || — || August 26, 2000 || Socorro || LINEAR || FLO || align=right | 1.6 km || 
|-id=811 bgcolor=#fefefe
| 61811 ||  || — || August 26, 2000 || Socorro || LINEAR || V || align=right | 2.2 km || 
|-id=812 bgcolor=#fefefe
| 61812 ||  || — || August 26, 2000 || Socorro || LINEAR || — || align=right | 2.2 km || 
|-id=813 bgcolor=#E9E9E9
| 61813 ||  || — || August 26, 2000 || Socorro || LINEAR || — || align=right | 2.7 km || 
|-id=814 bgcolor=#fefefe
| 61814 ||  || — || August 26, 2000 || Socorro || LINEAR || — || align=right | 2.2 km || 
|-id=815 bgcolor=#fefefe
| 61815 ||  || — || August 26, 2000 || Socorro || LINEAR || ERI || align=right | 5.2 km || 
|-id=816 bgcolor=#fefefe
| 61816 ||  || — || August 26, 2000 || Socorro || LINEAR || — || align=right | 2.0 km || 
|-id=817 bgcolor=#fefefe
| 61817 ||  || — || August 26, 2000 || Socorro || LINEAR || V || align=right | 1.9 km || 
|-id=818 bgcolor=#fefefe
| 61818 ||  || — || August 26, 2000 || Socorro || LINEAR || FLO || align=right | 1.8 km || 
|-id=819 bgcolor=#fefefe
| 61819 ||  || — || August 26, 2000 || Socorro || LINEAR || V || align=right | 1.6 km || 
|-id=820 bgcolor=#d6d6d6
| 61820 ||  || — || August 26, 2000 || Socorro || LINEAR || SYL7:4 || align=right | 8.9 km || 
|-id=821 bgcolor=#fefefe
| 61821 ||  || — || August 26, 2000 || Socorro || LINEAR || — || align=right | 3.3 km || 
|-id=822 bgcolor=#d6d6d6
| 61822 ||  || — || August 26, 2000 || Socorro || LINEAR || — || align=right | 7.4 km || 
|-id=823 bgcolor=#d6d6d6
| 61823 ||  || — || August 29, 2000 || Socorro || LINEAR || — || align=right | 6.4 km || 
|-id=824 bgcolor=#E9E9E9
| 61824 ||  || — || August 29, 2000 || Socorro || LINEAR || — || align=right | 4.8 km || 
|-id=825 bgcolor=#E9E9E9
| 61825 ||  || — || August 29, 2000 || Socorro || LINEAR || AGN || align=right | 3.2 km || 
|-id=826 bgcolor=#fefefe
| 61826 ||  || — || August 31, 2000 || Socorro || LINEAR || NYS || align=right | 4.4 km || 
|-id=827 bgcolor=#E9E9E9
| 61827 ||  || — || August 26, 2000 || Socorro || LINEAR || — || align=right | 2.4 km || 
|-id=828 bgcolor=#fefefe
| 61828 ||  || — || August 26, 2000 || Socorro || LINEAR || — || align=right | 2.3 km || 
|-id=829 bgcolor=#E9E9E9
| 61829 ||  || — || August 26, 2000 || Socorro || LINEAR || — || align=right | 2.8 km || 
|-id=830 bgcolor=#d6d6d6
| 61830 ||  || — || August 28, 2000 || Socorro || LINEAR || — || align=right | 5.6 km || 
|-id=831 bgcolor=#E9E9E9
| 61831 ||  || — || August 28, 2000 || Socorro || LINEAR || — || align=right | 2.8 km || 
|-id=832 bgcolor=#E9E9E9
| 61832 ||  || — || August 29, 2000 || Socorro || LINEAR || — || align=right | 3.2 km || 
|-id=833 bgcolor=#fefefe
| 61833 ||  || — || August 29, 2000 || Socorro || LINEAR || V || align=right | 2.0 km || 
|-id=834 bgcolor=#E9E9E9
| 61834 ||  || — || August 29, 2000 || Socorro || LINEAR || — || align=right | 1.8 km || 
|-id=835 bgcolor=#d6d6d6
| 61835 ||  || — || August 29, 2000 || Socorro || LINEAR || KOR || align=right | 3.1 km || 
|-id=836 bgcolor=#fefefe
| 61836 ||  || — || August 29, 2000 || Socorro || LINEAR || — || align=right | 2.6 km || 
|-id=837 bgcolor=#fefefe
| 61837 ||  || — || August 29, 2000 || Socorro || LINEAR || NYS || align=right | 1.8 km || 
|-id=838 bgcolor=#E9E9E9
| 61838 ||  || — || August 29, 2000 || Socorro || LINEAR || AST || align=right | 3.9 km || 
|-id=839 bgcolor=#fefefe
| 61839 ||  || — || August 29, 2000 || Socorro || LINEAR || MAS || align=right | 1.9 km || 
|-id=840 bgcolor=#E9E9E9
| 61840 ||  || — || August 29, 2000 || Socorro || LINEAR || — || align=right | 2.5 km || 
|-id=841 bgcolor=#E9E9E9
| 61841 ||  || — || August 29, 2000 || Socorro || LINEAR || — || align=right | 5.2 km || 
|-id=842 bgcolor=#E9E9E9
| 61842 ||  || — || August 29, 2000 || Socorro || LINEAR || — || align=right | 4.5 km || 
|-id=843 bgcolor=#E9E9E9
| 61843 ||  || — || August 29, 2000 || Socorro || LINEAR || HEN || align=right | 2.0 km || 
|-id=844 bgcolor=#d6d6d6
| 61844 ||  || — || August 29, 2000 || Socorro || LINEAR || — || align=right | 7.1 km || 
|-id=845 bgcolor=#d6d6d6
| 61845 ||  || — || August 29, 2000 || Socorro || LINEAR || — || align=right | 5.9 km || 
|-id=846 bgcolor=#E9E9E9
| 61846 ||  || — || August 29, 2000 || Socorro || LINEAR || — || align=right | 5.5 km || 
|-id=847 bgcolor=#fefefe
| 61847 ||  || — || August 29, 2000 || Socorro || LINEAR || NYS || align=right | 4.3 km || 
|-id=848 bgcolor=#d6d6d6
| 61848 ||  || — || August 29, 2000 || Socorro || LINEAR || — || align=right | 6.7 km || 
|-id=849 bgcolor=#fefefe
| 61849 ||  || — || August 29, 2000 || Socorro || LINEAR || NYS || align=right | 1.9 km || 
|-id=850 bgcolor=#E9E9E9
| 61850 ||  || — || August 29, 2000 || Socorro || LINEAR || — || align=right | 3.3 km || 
|-id=851 bgcolor=#fefefe
| 61851 ||  || — || August 29, 2000 || Socorro || LINEAR || — || align=right | 1.5 km || 
|-id=852 bgcolor=#d6d6d6
| 61852 ||  || — || August 29, 2000 || Socorro || LINEAR || KOR || align=right | 3.1 km || 
|-id=853 bgcolor=#fefefe
| 61853 ||  || — || August 31, 2000 || Socorro || LINEAR || — || align=right | 2.4 km || 
|-id=854 bgcolor=#d6d6d6
| 61854 ||  || — || August 31, 2000 || Socorro || LINEAR || — || align=right | 8.1 km || 
|-id=855 bgcolor=#d6d6d6
| 61855 ||  || — || August 31, 2000 || Socorro || LINEAR || KOR || align=right | 3.2 km || 
|-id=856 bgcolor=#E9E9E9
| 61856 ||  || — || August 31, 2000 || Socorro || LINEAR || — || align=right | 5.7 km || 
|-id=857 bgcolor=#d6d6d6
| 61857 ||  || — || August 31, 2000 || Socorro || LINEAR || KOR || align=right | 3.4 km || 
|-id=858 bgcolor=#fefefe
| 61858 ||  || — || August 31, 2000 || Socorro || LINEAR || NYS || align=right | 1.4 km || 
|-id=859 bgcolor=#d6d6d6
| 61859 ||  || — || August 31, 2000 || Socorro || LINEAR || — || align=right | 6.1 km || 
|-id=860 bgcolor=#E9E9E9
| 61860 ||  || — || August 31, 2000 || Socorro || LINEAR || — || align=right | 1.9 km || 
|-id=861 bgcolor=#E9E9E9
| 61861 ||  || — || August 31, 2000 || Socorro || LINEAR || — || align=right | 3.6 km || 
|-id=862 bgcolor=#d6d6d6
| 61862 ||  || — || August 31, 2000 || Socorro || LINEAR || EOS || align=right | 3.4 km || 
|-id=863 bgcolor=#fefefe
| 61863 ||  || — || August 31, 2000 || Socorro || LINEAR || MAS || align=right | 1.8 km || 
|-id=864 bgcolor=#d6d6d6
| 61864 ||  || — || August 31, 2000 || Socorro || LINEAR || — || align=right | 5.8 km || 
|-id=865 bgcolor=#d6d6d6
| 61865 ||  || — || August 31, 2000 || Socorro || LINEAR || KOR || align=right | 3.2 km || 
|-id=866 bgcolor=#fefefe
| 61866 ||  || — || August 31, 2000 || Socorro || LINEAR || — || align=right | 3.5 km || 
|-id=867 bgcolor=#E9E9E9
| 61867 ||  || — || August 31, 2000 || Socorro || LINEAR || — || align=right | 2.7 km || 
|-id=868 bgcolor=#d6d6d6
| 61868 ||  || — || August 31, 2000 || Socorro || LINEAR || KOR || align=right | 2.7 km || 
|-id=869 bgcolor=#E9E9E9
| 61869 ||  || — || August 31, 2000 || Socorro || LINEAR || — || align=right | 5.1 km || 
|-id=870 bgcolor=#E9E9E9
| 61870 ||  || — || August 31, 2000 || Socorro || LINEAR || HEN || align=right | 2.2 km || 
|-id=871 bgcolor=#fefefe
| 61871 ||  || — || August 31, 2000 || Socorro || LINEAR || — || align=right | 2.1 km || 
|-id=872 bgcolor=#d6d6d6
| 61872 ||  || — || August 31, 2000 || Socorro || LINEAR || KOR || align=right | 3.6 km || 
|-id=873 bgcolor=#d6d6d6
| 61873 ||  || — || August 31, 2000 || Socorro || LINEAR || CHA || align=right | 5.0 km || 
|-id=874 bgcolor=#d6d6d6
| 61874 ||  || — || August 31, 2000 || Socorro || LINEAR || — || align=right | 4.0 km || 
|-id=875 bgcolor=#fefefe
| 61875 ||  || — || August 31, 2000 || Socorro || LINEAR || — || align=right | 1.7 km || 
|-id=876 bgcolor=#d6d6d6
| 61876 ||  || — || August 31, 2000 || Socorro || LINEAR || KOR || align=right | 3.6 km || 
|-id=877 bgcolor=#d6d6d6
| 61877 ||  || — || August 31, 2000 || Socorro || LINEAR || — || align=right | 5.7 km || 
|-id=878 bgcolor=#d6d6d6
| 61878 ||  || — || August 31, 2000 || Socorro || LINEAR || EOS || align=right | 4.4 km || 
|-id=879 bgcolor=#d6d6d6
| 61879 ||  || — || August 31, 2000 || Socorro || LINEAR || — || align=right | 6.0 km || 
|-id=880 bgcolor=#d6d6d6
| 61880 ||  || — || August 31, 2000 || Socorro || LINEAR || EOS || align=right | 4.3 km || 
|-id=881 bgcolor=#d6d6d6
| 61881 ||  || — || August 31, 2000 || Socorro || LINEAR || — || align=right | 3.9 km || 
|-id=882 bgcolor=#d6d6d6
| 61882 ||  || — || August 31, 2000 || Socorro || LINEAR || — || align=right | 8.7 km || 
|-id=883 bgcolor=#fefefe
| 61883 ||  || — || August 20, 2000 || Anderson Mesa || LONEOS || — || align=right | 1.9 km || 
|-id=884 bgcolor=#d6d6d6
| 61884 ||  || — || August 20, 2000 || Anderson Mesa || LONEOS || THM || align=right | 5.5 km || 
|-id=885 bgcolor=#E9E9E9
| 61885 ||  || — || August 20, 2000 || Anderson Mesa || LONEOS || — || align=right | 3.9 km || 
|-id=886 bgcolor=#E9E9E9
| 61886 ||  || — || August 20, 2000 || Anderson Mesa || LONEOS || — || align=right | 2.5 km || 
|-id=887 bgcolor=#E9E9E9
| 61887 ||  || — || August 21, 2000 || Anderson Mesa || LONEOS || — || align=right | 3.6 km || 
|-id=888 bgcolor=#E9E9E9
| 61888 ||  || — || August 21, 2000 || Anderson Mesa || LONEOS || HEN || align=right | 2.8 km || 
|-id=889 bgcolor=#fefefe
| 61889 ||  || — || August 21, 2000 || Anderson Mesa || LONEOS || — || align=right | 1.9 km || 
|-id=890 bgcolor=#fefefe
| 61890 ||  || — || August 21, 2000 || Anderson Mesa || LONEOS || — || align=right | 2.2 km || 
|-id=891 bgcolor=#fefefe
| 61891 ||  || — || August 21, 2000 || Anderson Mesa || LONEOS || — || align=right | 2.1 km || 
|-id=892 bgcolor=#fefefe
| 61892 ||  || — || August 21, 2000 || Anderson Mesa || LONEOS || — || align=right | 2.9 km || 
|-id=893 bgcolor=#fefefe
| 61893 ||  || — || August 21, 2000 || Anderson Mesa || LONEOS || — || align=right | 2.2 km || 
|-id=894 bgcolor=#E9E9E9
| 61894 ||  || — || August 26, 2000 || Haleakala || NEAT || — || align=right | 4.3 km || 
|-id=895 bgcolor=#E9E9E9
| 61895 ||  || — || August 26, 2000 || Haleakala || NEAT || — || align=right | 4.8 km || 
|-id=896 bgcolor=#C2FFFF
| 61896 ||  || — || August 31, 2000 || Socorro || LINEAR || L5 || align=right | 18 km || 
|-id=897 bgcolor=#E9E9E9
| 61897 ||  || — || August 31, 2000 || Socorro || LINEAR || — || align=right | 1.7 km || 
|-id=898 bgcolor=#fefefe
| 61898 ||  || — || August 31, 2000 || Socorro || LINEAR || Vfast? || align=right | 1.7 km || 
|-id=899 bgcolor=#E9E9E9
| 61899 ||  || — || August 31, 2000 || Socorro || LINEAR || — || align=right | 3.1 km || 
|-id=900 bgcolor=#E9E9E9
| 61900 ||  || — || August 31, 2000 || Socorro || LINEAR || — || align=right | 5.8 km || 
|}

61901–62000 

|-bgcolor=#E9E9E9
| 61901 ||  || — || August 31, 2000 || Socorro || LINEAR || — || align=right | 4.7 km || 
|-id=902 bgcolor=#d6d6d6
| 61902 ||  || — || August 31, 2000 || Socorro || LINEAR || — || align=right | 5.5 km || 
|-id=903 bgcolor=#E9E9E9
| 61903 ||  || — || August 31, 2000 || Socorro || LINEAR || — || align=right | 2.5 km || 
|-id=904 bgcolor=#E9E9E9
| 61904 ||  || — || August 31, 2000 || Socorro || LINEAR || — || align=right | 4.2 km || 
|-id=905 bgcolor=#E9E9E9
| 61905 ||  || — || August 31, 2000 || Socorro || LINEAR || — || align=right | 5.4 km || 
|-id=906 bgcolor=#E9E9E9
| 61906 ||  || — || August 31, 2000 || Socorro || LINEAR || WIT || align=right | 2.6 km || 
|-id=907 bgcolor=#d6d6d6
| 61907 ||  || — || August 31, 2000 || Socorro || LINEAR || EOS || align=right | 4.0 km || 
|-id=908 bgcolor=#d6d6d6
| 61908 ||  || — || August 31, 2000 || Socorro || LINEAR || — || align=right | 2.6 km || 
|-id=909 bgcolor=#E9E9E9
| 61909 ||  || — || August 29, 2000 || Socorro || LINEAR || — || align=right | 1.8 km || 
|-id=910 bgcolor=#E9E9E9
| 61910 ||  || — || August 21, 2000 || Anderson Mesa || LONEOS || — || align=right | 5.6 km || 
|-id=911 bgcolor=#fefefe
| 61911 ||  || — || August 25, 2000 || Cerro Tololo || M. W. Buie || NYS || align=right | 3.1 km || 
|-id=912 bgcolor=#E9E9E9
| 61912 Storrs ||  ||  || August 27, 2000 || Cerro Tololo || S. D. Kern || — || align=right | 5.1 km || 
|-id=913 bgcolor=#E9E9E9
| 61913 Lanning ||  ||  || August 28, 2000 || Cerro Tololo || S. D. Kern || — || align=right | 2.9 km || 
|-id=914 bgcolor=#E9E9E9
| 61914 || 2000 RK || — || September 1, 2000 || Socorro || LINEAR || MAR || align=right | 3.9 km || 
|-id=915 bgcolor=#d6d6d6
| 61915 || 2000 RO || — || September 1, 2000 || Socorro || LINEAR || — || align=right | 7.3 km || 
|-id=916 bgcolor=#fefefe
| 61916 ||  || — || September 1, 2000 || Socorro || LINEAR || — || align=right | 2.3 km || 
|-id=917 bgcolor=#fefefe
| 61917 ||  || — || September 1, 2000 || Socorro || LINEAR || NYS || align=right | 1.5 km || 
|-id=918 bgcolor=#E9E9E9
| 61918 ||  || — || September 1, 2000 || Socorro || LINEAR || — || align=right | 5.9 km || 
|-id=919 bgcolor=#fefefe
| 61919 ||  || — || September 1, 2000 || Socorro || LINEAR || NYS || align=right | 4.5 km || 
|-id=920 bgcolor=#fefefe
| 61920 ||  || — || September 1, 2000 || Socorro || LINEAR || NYS || align=right | 1.5 km || 
|-id=921 bgcolor=#fefefe
| 61921 ||  || — || September 1, 2000 || Socorro || LINEAR || — || align=right | 1.7 km || 
|-id=922 bgcolor=#E9E9E9
| 61922 ||  || — || September 1, 2000 || Socorro || LINEAR || — || align=right | 3.8 km || 
|-id=923 bgcolor=#fefefe
| 61923 ||  || — || September 1, 2000 || Socorro || LINEAR || — || align=right | 1.5 km || 
|-id=924 bgcolor=#d6d6d6
| 61924 ||  || — || September 1, 2000 || Socorro || LINEAR || HYG || align=right | 10 km || 
|-id=925 bgcolor=#d6d6d6
| 61925 ||  || — || September 1, 2000 || Socorro || LINEAR || ALA || align=right | 8.2 km || 
|-id=926 bgcolor=#d6d6d6
| 61926 ||  || — || September 1, 2000 || Socorro || LINEAR || EOS || align=right | 5.2 km || 
|-id=927 bgcolor=#E9E9E9
| 61927 ||  || — || September 1, 2000 || Socorro || LINEAR || GEF || align=right | 3.5 km || 
|-id=928 bgcolor=#E9E9E9
| 61928 ||  || — || September 1, 2000 || Socorro || LINEAR || IAN || align=right | 3.0 km || 
|-id=929 bgcolor=#fefefe
| 61929 ||  || — || September 1, 2000 || Socorro || LINEAR || V || align=right | 1.8 km || 
|-id=930 bgcolor=#d6d6d6
| 61930 ||  || — || September 1, 2000 || Socorro || LINEAR || — || align=right | 10 km || 
|-id=931 bgcolor=#fefefe
| 61931 ||  || — || September 1, 2000 || Socorro || LINEAR || NYS || align=right | 2.0 km || 
|-id=932 bgcolor=#fefefe
| 61932 ||  || — || September 1, 2000 || Socorro || LINEAR || — || align=right | 1.4 km || 
|-id=933 bgcolor=#E9E9E9
| 61933 ||  || — || September 1, 2000 || Socorro || LINEAR || — || align=right | 5.7 km || 
|-id=934 bgcolor=#fefefe
| 61934 ||  || — || September 1, 2000 || Socorro || LINEAR || — || align=right | 1.8 km || 
|-id=935 bgcolor=#d6d6d6
| 61935 ||  || — || September 1, 2000 || Socorro || LINEAR || HYG || align=right | 10 km || 
|-id=936 bgcolor=#E9E9E9
| 61936 ||  || — || September 1, 2000 || Socorro || LINEAR || — || align=right | 2.3 km || 
|-id=937 bgcolor=#E9E9E9
| 61937 ||  || — || September 1, 2000 || Socorro || LINEAR || — || align=right | 5.0 km || 
|-id=938 bgcolor=#fefefe
| 61938 ||  || — || September 1, 2000 || Socorro || LINEAR || — || align=right | 2.5 km || 
|-id=939 bgcolor=#E9E9E9
| 61939 ||  || — || September 1, 2000 || Socorro || LINEAR || — || align=right | 3.6 km || 
|-id=940 bgcolor=#d6d6d6
| 61940 ||  || — || September 1, 2000 || Socorro || LINEAR || — || align=right | 7.1 km || 
|-id=941 bgcolor=#fefefe
| 61941 ||  || — || September 1, 2000 || Socorro || LINEAR || — || align=right | 3.2 km || 
|-id=942 bgcolor=#fefefe
| 61942 ||  || — || September 2, 2000 || Višnjan Observatory || K. Korlević || — || align=right | 2.2 km || 
|-id=943 bgcolor=#fefefe
| 61943 ||  || — || September 1, 2000 || Socorro || LINEAR || — || align=right | 3.0 km || 
|-id=944 bgcolor=#fefefe
| 61944 ||  || — || September 1, 2000 || Socorro || LINEAR || — || align=right | 2.2 km || 
|-id=945 bgcolor=#d6d6d6
| 61945 ||  || — || September 1, 2000 || Socorro || LINEAR || EOS || align=right | 4.6 km || 
|-id=946 bgcolor=#E9E9E9
| 61946 ||  || — || September 1, 2000 || Socorro || LINEAR || EUN || align=right | 2.6 km || 
|-id=947 bgcolor=#d6d6d6
| 61947 ||  || — || September 1, 2000 || Socorro || LINEAR || EOS || align=right | 5.0 km || 
|-id=948 bgcolor=#d6d6d6
| 61948 ||  || — || September 1, 2000 || Socorro || LINEAR || — || align=right | 8.5 km || 
|-id=949 bgcolor=#fefefe
| 61949 ||  || — || September 1, 2000 || Socorro || LINEAR || — || align=right | 2.7 km || 
|-id=950 bgcolor=#d6d6d6
| 61950 ||  || — || September 1, 2000 || Socorro || LINEAR || — || align=right | 8.3 km || 
|-id=951 bgcolor=#E9E9E9
| 61951 ||  || — || September 1, 2000 || Socorro || LINEAR || — || align=right | 3.4 km || 
|-id=952 bgcolor=#E9E9E9
| 61952 ||  || — || September 1, 2000 || Socorro || LINEAR || ADE || align=right | 4.7 km || 
|-id=953 bgcolor=#d6d6d6
| 61953 ||  || — || September 1, 2000 || Socorro || LINEAR || EOS || align=right | 5.1 km || 
|-id=954 bgcolor=#d6d6d6
| 61954 ||  || — || September 1, 2000 || Socorro || LINEAR || — || align=right | 5.6 km || 
|-id=955 bgcolor=#E9E9E9
| 61955 ||  || — || September 1, 2000 || Socorro || LINEAR || — || align=right | 3.2 km || 
|-id=956 bgcolor=#fefefe
| 61956 ||  || — || September 1, 2000 || Socorro || LINEAR || — || align=right | 2.1 km || 
|-id=957 bgcolor=#d6d6d6
| 61957 ||  || — || September 1, 2000 || Socorro || LINEAR || — || align=right | 11 km || 
|-id=958 bgcolor=#E9E9E9
| 61958 ||  || — || September 1, 2000 || Socorro || LINEAR || — || align=right | 5.7 km || 
|-id=959 bgcolor=#d6d6d6
| 61959 ||  || — || September 1, 2000 || Socorro || LINEAR || MEL || align=right | 7.8 km || 
|-id=960 bgcolor=#d6d6d6
| 61960 ||  || — || September 1, 2000 || Socorro || LINEAR || — || align=right | 9.1 km || 
|-id=961 bgcolor=#d6d6d6
| 61961 ||  || — || September 1, 2000 || Socorro || LINEAR || EOS || align=right | 6.5 km || 
|-id=962 bgcolor=#fefefe
| 61962 ||  || — || September 1, 2000 || Socorro || LINEAR || — || align=right | 3.6 km || 
|-id=963 bgcolor=#E9E9E9
| 61963 ||  || — || September 1, 2000 || Socorro || LINEAR || — || align=right | 6.0 km || 
|-id=964 bgcolor=#E9E9E9
| 61964 ||  || — || September 1, 2000 || Socorro || LINEAR || — || align=right | 3.4 km || 
|-id=965 bgcolor=#d6d6d6
| 61965 ||  || — || September 1, 2000 || Socorro || LINEAR || EOS || align=right | 5.6 km || 
|-id=966 bgcolor=#E9E9E9
| 61966 ||  || — || September 1, 2000 || Socorro || LINEAR || — || align=right | 4.0 km || 
|-id=967 bgcolor=#E9E9E9
| 61967 ||  || — || September 1, 2000 || Socorro || LINEAR || — || align=right | 6.0 km || 
|-id=968 bgcolor=#fefefe
| 61968 ||  || — || September 1, 2000 || Socorro || LINEAR || — || align=right | 1.7 km || 
|-id=969 bgcolor=#E9E9E9
| 61969 ||  || — || September 1, 2000 || Socorro || LINEAR || — || align=right | 2.6 km || 
|-id=970 bgcolor=#d6d6d6
| 61970 ||  || — || September 1, 2000 || Socorro || LINEAR || EOS || align=right | 4.3 km || 
|-id=971 bgcolor=#fefefe
| 61971 ||  || — || September 1, 2000 || Socorro || LINEAR || — || align=right | 1.5 km || 
|-id=972 bgcolor=#fefefe
| 61972 ||  || — || September 1, 2000 || Socorro || LINEAR || — || align=right | 2.5 km || 
|-id=973 bgcolor=#d6d6d6
| 61973 ||  || — || September 1, 2000 || Socorro || LINEAR || EOS || align=right | 4.6 km || 
|-id=974 bgcolor=#E9E9E9
| 61974 ||  || — || September 1, 2000 || Socorro || LINEAR || GEF || align=right | 3.1 km || 
|-id=975 bgcolor=#d6d6d6
| 61975 ||  || — || September 1, 2000 || Socorro || LINEAR || EOS || align=right | 5.9 km || 
|-id=976 bgcolor=#E9E9E9
| 61976 ||  || — || September 1, 2000 || Socorro || LINEAR || — || align=right | 3.1 km || 
|-id=977 bgcolor=#fefefe
| 61977 ||  || — || September 1, 2000 || Socorro || LINEAR || — || align=right | 2.3 km || 
|-id=978 bgcolor=#E9E9E9
| 61978 ||  || — || September 1, 2000 || Socorro || LINEAR || PAD || align=right | 4.1 km || 
|-id=979 bgcolor=#fefefe
| 61979 ||  || — || September 1, 2000 || Socorro || LINEAR || — || align=right | 2.2 km || 
|-id=980 bgcolor=#E9E9E9
| 61980 ||  || — || September 1, 2000 || Socorro || LINEAR || — || align=right | 6.0 km || 
|-id=981 bgcolor=#d6d6d6
| 61981 ||  || — || September 1, 2000 || Socorro || LINEAR || — || align=right | 4.5 km || 
|-id=982 bgcolor=#d6d6d6
| 61982 ||  || — || September 1, 2000 || Socorro || LINEAR || URS || align=right | 5.8 km || 
|-id=983 bgcolor=#E9E9E9
| 61983 ||  || — || September 1, 2000 || Socorro || LINEAR || — || align=right | 3.5 km || 
|-id=984 bgcolor=#d6d6d6
| 61984 ||  || — || September 1, 2000 || Socorro || LINEAR || — || align=right | 7.3 km || 
|-id=985 bgcolor=#E9E9E9
| 61985 ||  || — || September 1, 2000 || Socorro || LINEAR || — || align=right | 3.7 km || 
|-id=986 bgcolor=#fefefe
| 61986 ||  || — || September 1, 2000 || Socorro || LINEAR || V || align=right | 3.1 km || 
|-id=987 bgcolor=#d6d6d6
| 61987 ||  || — || September 1, 2000 || Socorro || LINEAR || — || align=right | 6.4 km || 
|-id=988 bgcolor=#E9E9E9
| 61988 ||  || — || September 1, 2000 || Socorro || LINEAR || — || align=right | 7.0 km || 
|-id=989 bgcolor=#E9E9E9
| 61989 ||  || — || September 1, 2000 || Socorro || LINEAR || — || align=right | 6.2 km || 
|-id=990 bgcolor=#d6d6d6
| 61990 ||  || — || September 1, 2000 || Socorro || LINEAR || — || align=right | 7.3 km || 
|-id=991 bgcolor=#fefefe
| 61991 ||  || — || September 1, 2000 || Socorro || LINEAR || SUL || align=right | 6.2 km || 
|-id=992 bgcolor=#E9E9E9
| 61992 ||  || — || September 1, 2000 || Socorro || LINEAR || GEF || align=right | 3.4 km || 
|-id=993 bgcolor=#E9E9E9
| 61993 ||  || — || September 1, 2000 || Socorro || LINEAR || PAD || align=right | 5.0 km || 
|-id=994 bgcolor=#E9E9E9
| 61994 ||  || — || September 1, 2000 || Socorro || LINEAR || ADE || align=right | 5.9 km || 
|-id=995 bgcolor=#fefefe
| 61995 ||  || — || September 1, 2000 || Socorro || LINEAR || V || align=right | 1.6 km || 
|-id=996 bgcolor=#E9E9E9
| 61996 ||  || — || September 1, 2000 || Socorro || LINEAR || — || align=right | 4.1 km || 
|-id=997 bgcolor=#E9E9E9
| 61997 ||  || — || September 1, 2000 || Socorro || LINEAR || — || align=right | 2.5 km || 
|-id=998 bgcolor=#fefefe
| 61998 ||  || — || September 1, 2000 || Socorro || LINEAR || — || align=right | 2.5 km || 
|-id=999 bgcolor=#E9E9E9
| 61999 ||  || — || September 2, 2000 || Socorro || LINEAR || MAR || align=right | 2.9 km || 
|-id=000 bgcolor=#d6d6d6
| 62000 ||  || — || September 3, 2000 || Kitt Peak || Spacewatch || — || align=right | 7.1 km || 
|}

References

External links 
 Discovery Circumstances: Numbered Minor Planets (60001)–(65000) (IAU Minor Planet Center)

0061